= Jean Ignace Isidore Gérard =

French caricaturist (1803–1847)

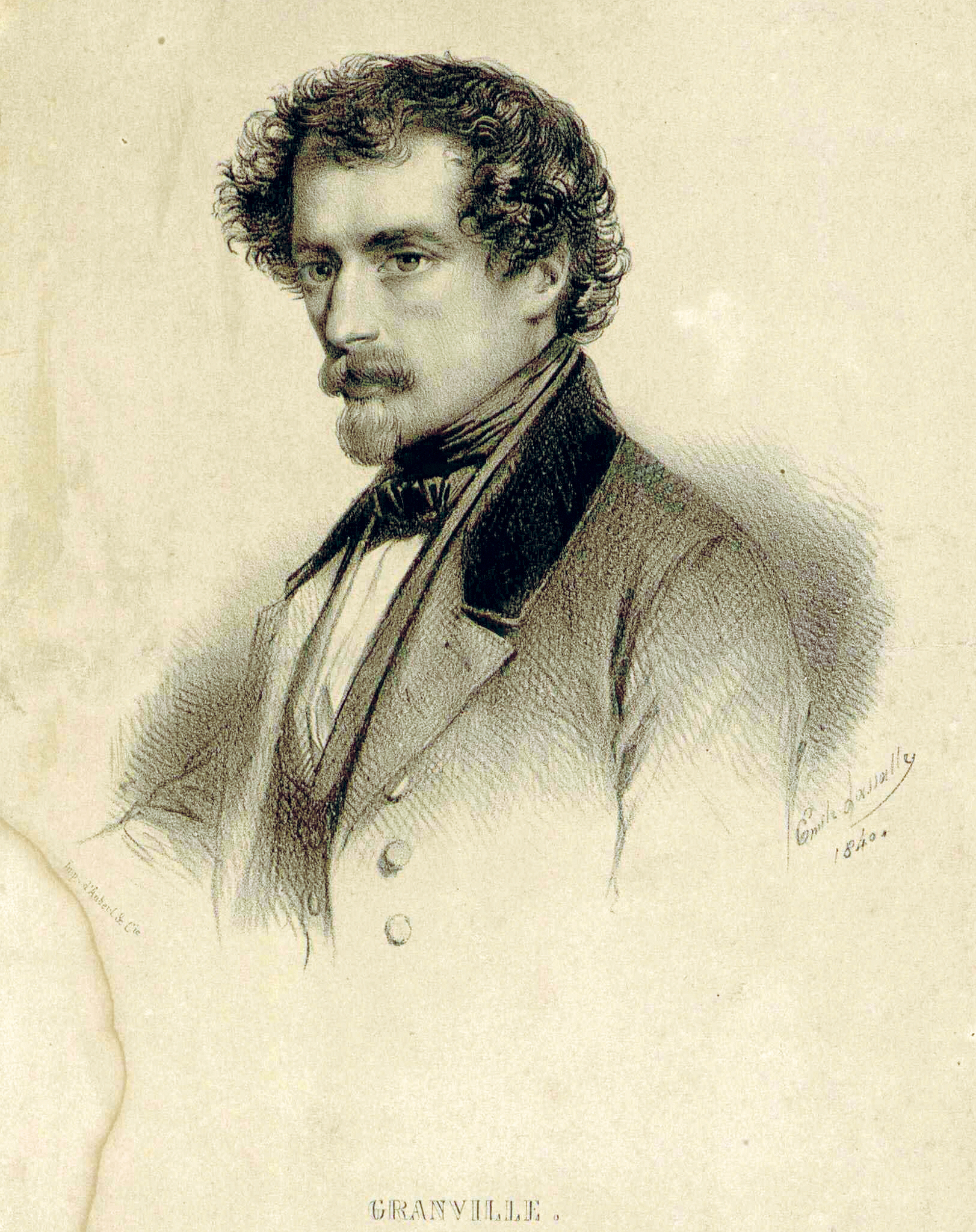
- Portrait by Émile Lassalle (1840)
- Born: 13 September 1803; Nancy, France
- Died: 17 March 1847 (aged 43); Vanves, Paris, France
- Resting place: Cimetière Nord de Saint-Mandé, Paris
- Known for: Illustrator, caricaturist, artist, printmaker
- Notable work: La Fontaine's Fables, Un Autre Monde, Les Fleurs Animées
- Other names: Grandville, Granville

Jean Ignace Isidore Gérard (French pronunciation: [ʒɑ̃ iɲas izidɔʁ ʒeʁaʁ]; 13 September 1803 – 17 March 1847) was a prolific French illustrator and caricaturist who published under the pseudonym of Grandville ([ɡʁɑ̃vil]), and numerous variations (e. g. Jean-Jacques Grandville, Jean Ignace Isidore Grandville) throughout his career. Art historians and critics have called him "the first star of French caricature's great age", and described his illustrations as featuring "elements of the symbolic, dreamlike, and incongruous" while retaining a sense of social commentary, and "the strangest and most pernicious transfigurement of the human shape ever produced by the Romantic imagination". The anthropomorphic vegetables and zoomorphic figures that populated his cartoons anticipated and influenced the work of generations of cartoonists and illustrators from John Tenniel, to Gustave Doré, to Félicien Rops, and Walt Disney. He has also been called a "proto-surrealist" and was greatly admired by André Breton and others in the movement.

Grandville was born in 1803, in Nancy, France into a family of artist and actors and received his earliest instruction in drawing from his father. He moved to Paris about 1823–1825 and began designing illustrations. His reputation was established in 1829 when he published a set of 70 lithographs titled Les Métamorphoses du jour. During the July Revolution of 1830 and the turbulent years that followed, he worked with Honoré Daumier and others producing provocative political cartoons for periodicals that were highly critical of the new monarchy of Louis Philippe I. After strict censorship laws were passed and threats from the police in 1835, Grandville turned to book illustration. He illustrated several classics such as La Fontaine's Fables, Defoe's Robinson Crusoe, Swift's Gulliver's Travels, and Cervantes's Don Quixote. In later years his books were increasingly centered around his illustrations, with the text written for his images e.g. Un autre monde (1844), Cent proverbes: têxte par trois Tetes dans un bonnet (1845), and Les fleurs animées (1846). Grandville typically made drawings for publishers that were later copied into lithographs and woodcuts by professional engravers, only occasionally did he make his own prints.

He married his cousin Marguerite Henriette Fischer in 1833 and they had three sons, but Marguerite and all three sons predeceased him, all on separate occasions. He remarried in 1843 to Catherine Marceline "Céline" Lhuillier and they had one son, Armand in 1845. Traditional accounts say that he went mad and died in an insane asylum; however, recent authors say that although the hospital where he died in Paris, Maison de Santé in Vanves, did treat the mentally ill among other illnesses, he was not "mad" and likely died of a throat infection, possibly diphtheria.

== Life ==
=== Early life: 1803–1830 ===
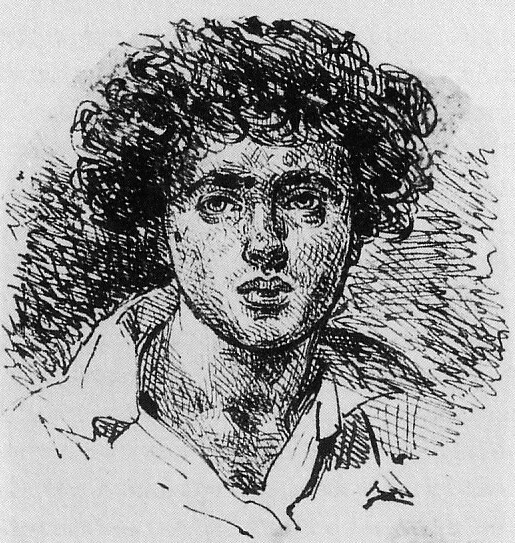
Grandville, self-portrait (c. 1820–1822), pen-and-ink

Jean Ignace Isidore Gerard, "Grandville", was born on September 15, 1803, in Nancy, Meurthe-et-Moselle, in northeastern France. His parents called him Adolphe, a name that originated from an older brother who had died three months before Grandville was born, and a name that followed him through the rest of his life. His father, Jean-Baptiste Gérard, was a noted painter of miniatures. He inherited his father's talent and exhibited an aptitude for drawing at an early age. He received his earliest education in art from his father and several authors have noted his father's influence on his draftsmanship and dense compositions, even in his mature work. Another painter of miniatures and lithographer, Léon-André Larue, called Mansion, was a relative who encouraged Grandville to go to Paris and learn lithography. Lithography had only recently been invented in Germany in the 1790s and was rapidly gaining popularity in Paris as a fast and cheap alternative to engraving and etching, for mass-producing prints and illustrated publications. In a period of social and political turmoil, inexpensive illustrated newspapers were coming into vogue, and opportunities for draftsmen and illustrators were also on the rise among the publishers and lithography studios in Paris at that time. Grandville was drawn to and influenced by the satirical prints, caricatures, and illustrations (often political) that were growing in popularity in France. Sources differ on the exact year and age, but after completing school, c. 1823–1825, Grandville moved to Paris and began pursuing a career in illustration and lithography. One account states his first lithograph titled La Marchande de cerises (The Cherry Seller), was published in Nancy 1824 or 1825.

Grandville's parents had friends and family in Paris working in the theater who provided work and connections early on, including a relative, Frédéric Lemétheyer, who was a stage manager in the Opéra-Comique. He began using his pseudonym, "Grandville" in Paris. It was derived from "Gérard de Grandville", his paternal grandparents stage name when they were actors and worked in the court of Lorraine. The pseudonym Grandville appeared in numerous variations throughout his career, including Grandville, Jean-Jacques Granville, J. J. Grandville, Jean Ignace Isidore Grandville, J. I. I. Grandville, Jean de Granville, and other variants. He designed illustrations for decks of playing cards and worked with Hippolyte Lecomte, a painter and ballet set designer in Paris, for whom he produced a set of color lithographs Costumes De Théãter in 1826. That set was followed by additional series including 12 lithographs created for the printer Langlumé titled Les Dimanches d'un bourgeois de Paris ou Les tribulations de la petite propriété (Sundays of a Paris Bourgeois or The Tribulations of Small Property), in 1826. Subsequent collections included 53 prints in La Sibylle des salons (The Sibyl of the Salons) in 1827 and 12 prints in Titres pour morceaux de musique (Titles for Musical Pieces) in 1828.

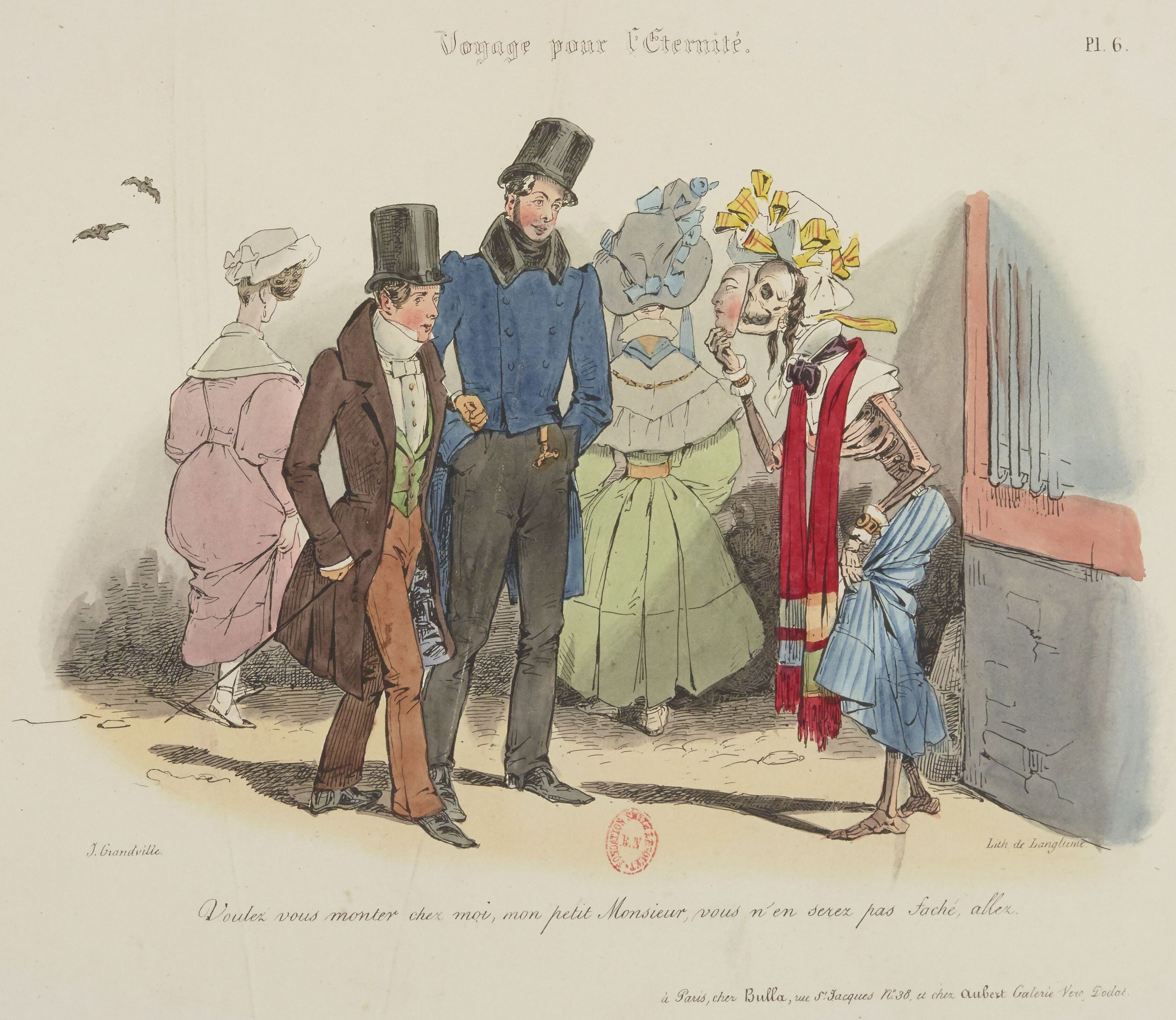
Voyage pour L'éternite, No. 6: Would you like to go up to my place, my little sir, You will not be disappointed! (1830), hand-colored lithograph, alluding to syphilis.

Grandville lived a bohemian life in the late 1820s and early 1830s, renting in a small room on the upper floor of a building which is said to have been crowded with pens and papers where he drew incessantly. It became a gathering place for artist, writers, singers, lithographers and others. The painter Paul Delaroche was a neighbor during this period. Alexandre Dumas was among the milieu and later wrote of the time, "If we had money, we had beer. If not, we were happy just to smoke, joke and argue." Grandville was described as a thin, somewhat quiet, and at times melancholy man, although Dumas noted he also had a sharp wit and a competitive side to him. It was in this period that he met the charismatic 28-year-old Charles Philipon, an editor and lithographer with the newspaper La Silhouette.

Grandville's first real success was Les Métamorphoses du jour (The Metamorphoses of the Day), a set of 70 color lithographs published in 1829. In this series, figures with human bodies but the heads of various animals, from fish to elephants, are depicted acting out a human comedy, perceptively satirizing the bourgeois of Paris and human nature in general. It established his reputation with the public and he was thereafter sought after as an illustrator by publishers and periodicals. In 1830 he published Voyage pour l'éternité (Voyage to Eternity), a series of nine lithographs in which death, in the form of a variously dressed skeleton, pays visits to a variety of Parisians, and is finally seen triumphantly leading a parade of young soldiers to their fate. Printing was stopped after only few copies were made due to the dark theme, which was possibly inspired by Thomas Rowlandson's Dance of Death. However, it did succeed in gaining him more notoriety and the admiration of a few such as Champfleury and Honoré de Balzac.

Les Métamorphoses du jour (1829), color lithographs

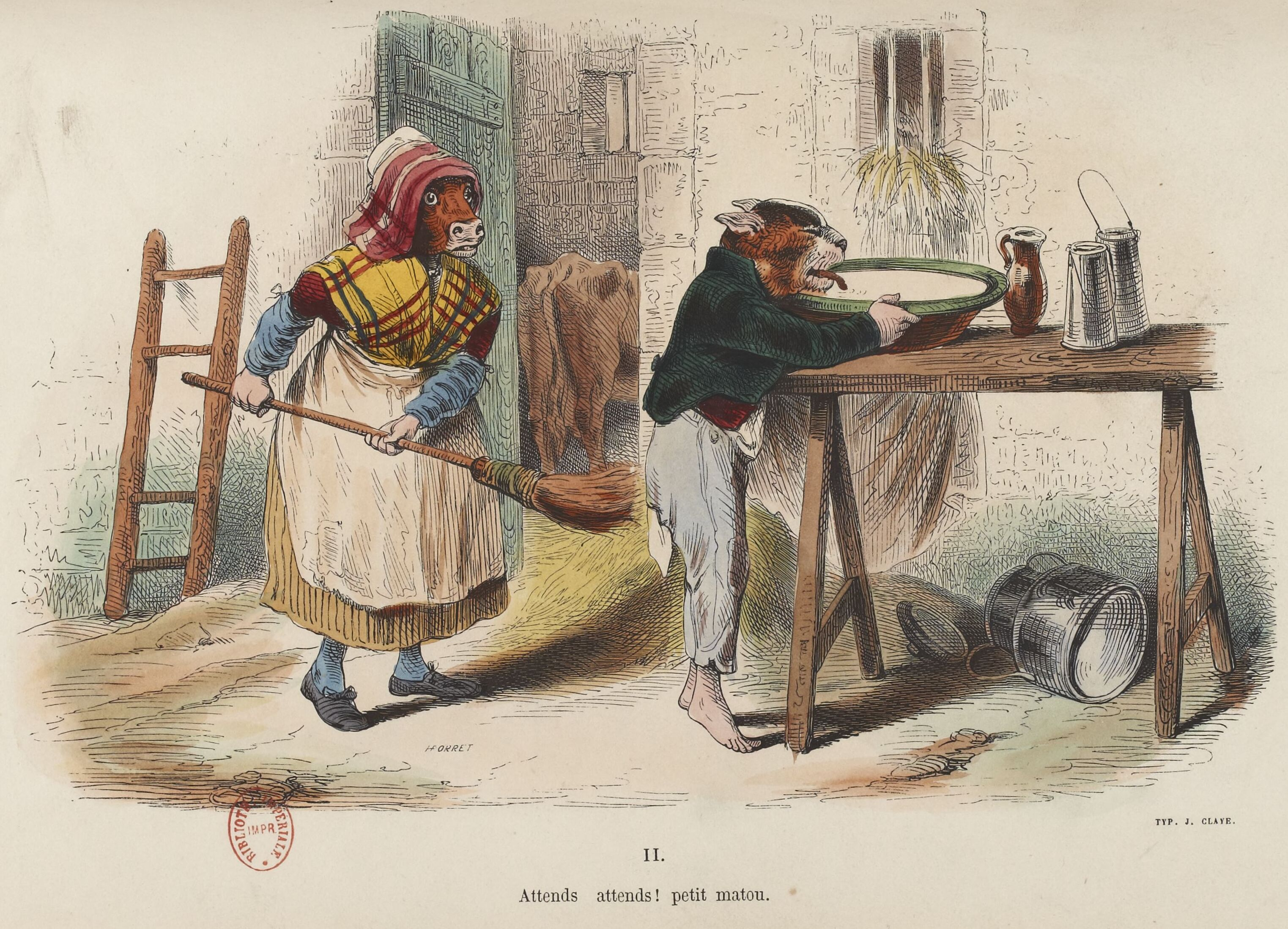
No. 2: Attends Attends! petit matou (Wait wait! little cat).

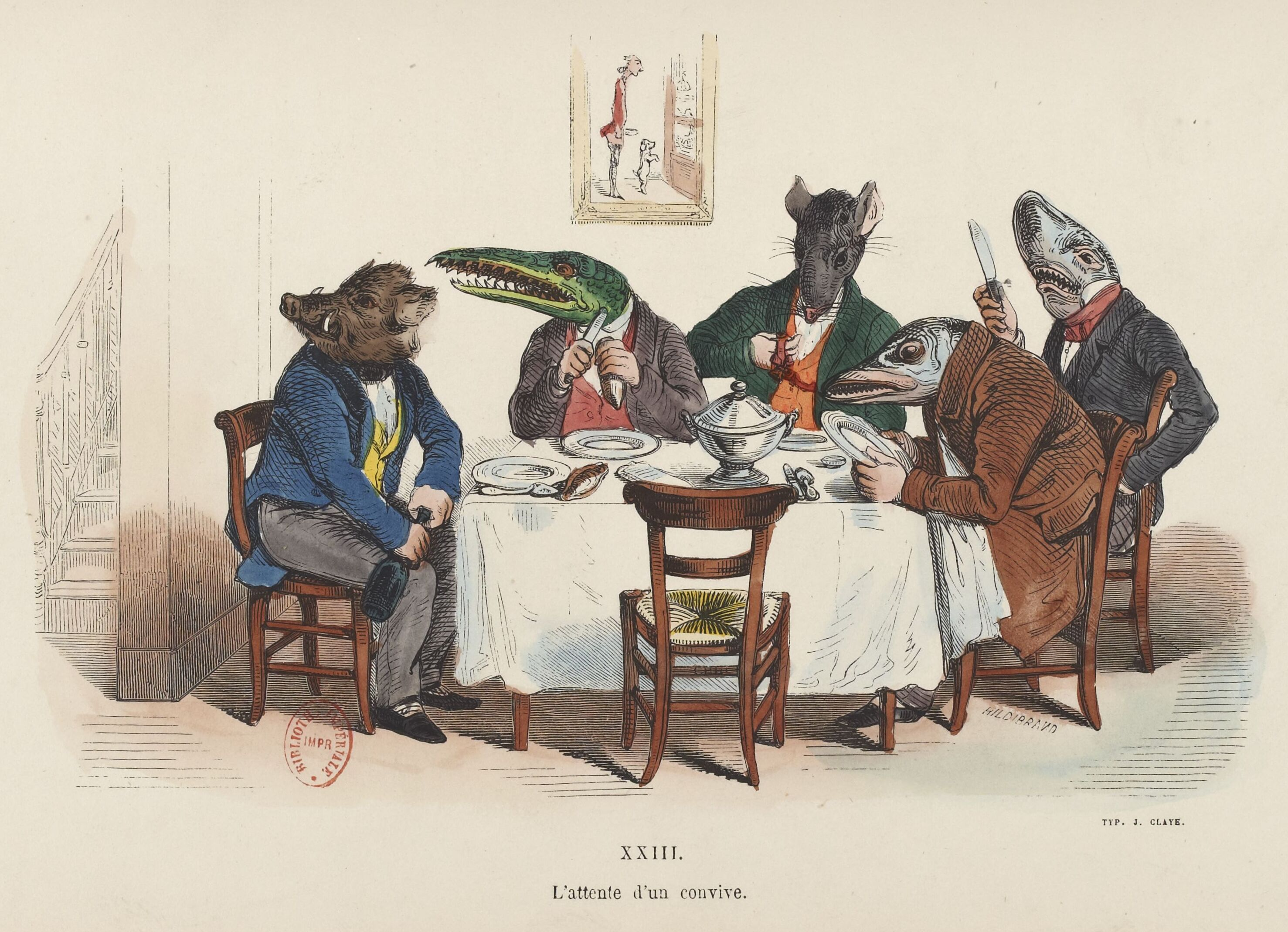
No. 23: L'attente d'un convive (Waiting for a guest).

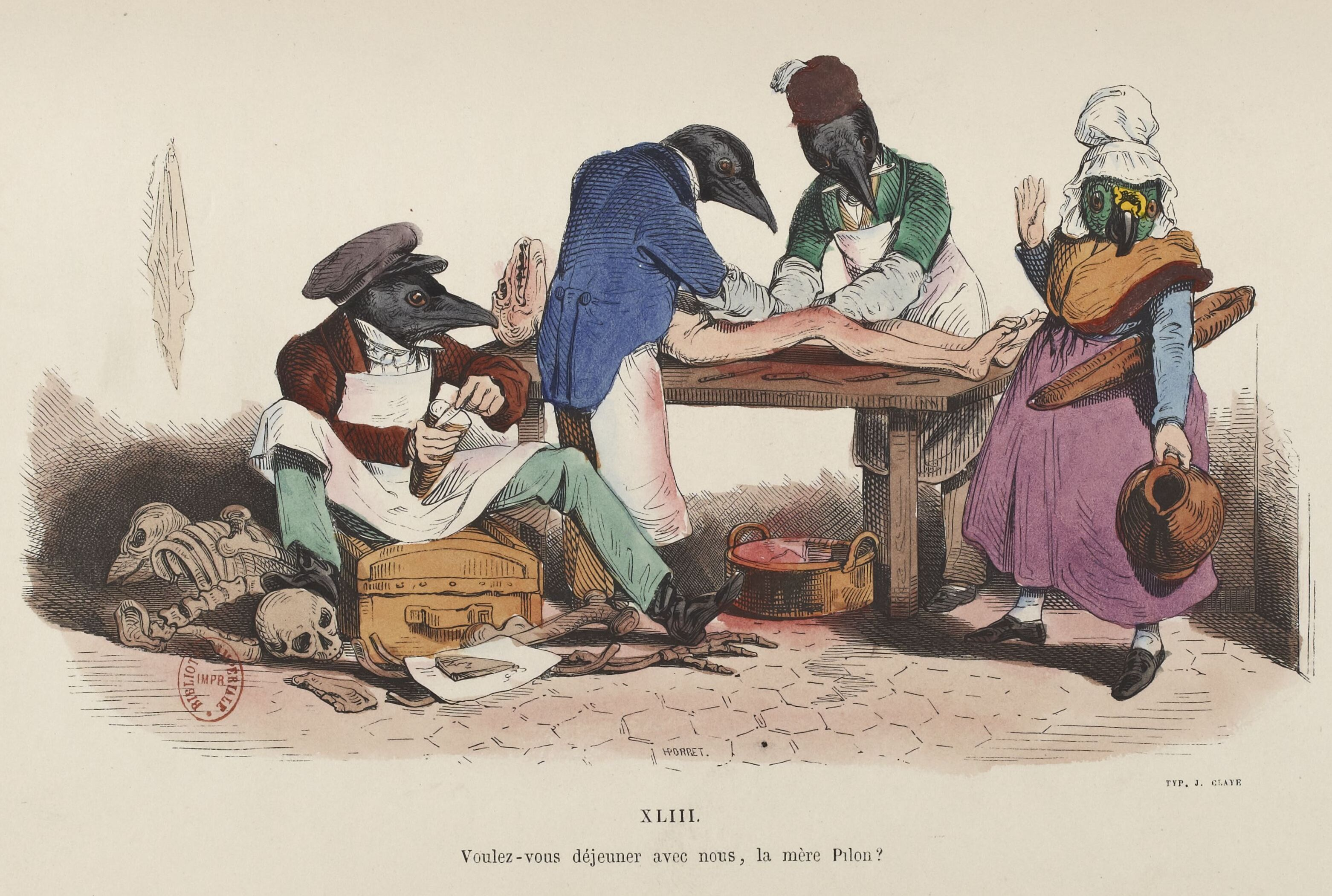
No. 43: Voulez-vous déjeuner avec nous, la mére Pilon? (Would you like to have lunch with us, mother Pilon?).

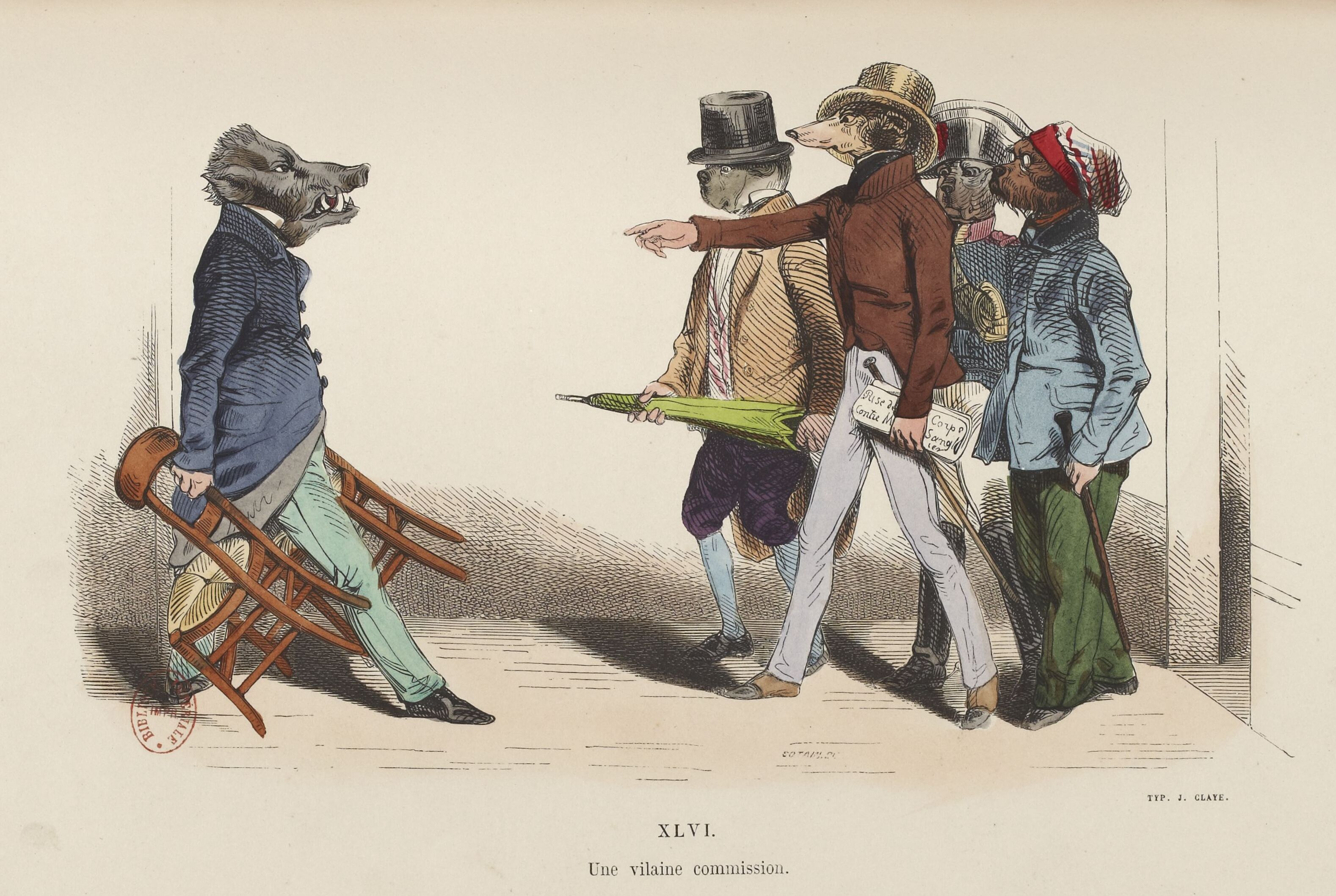
No. 46: Une vilaine commission (An Ugly Delegation).

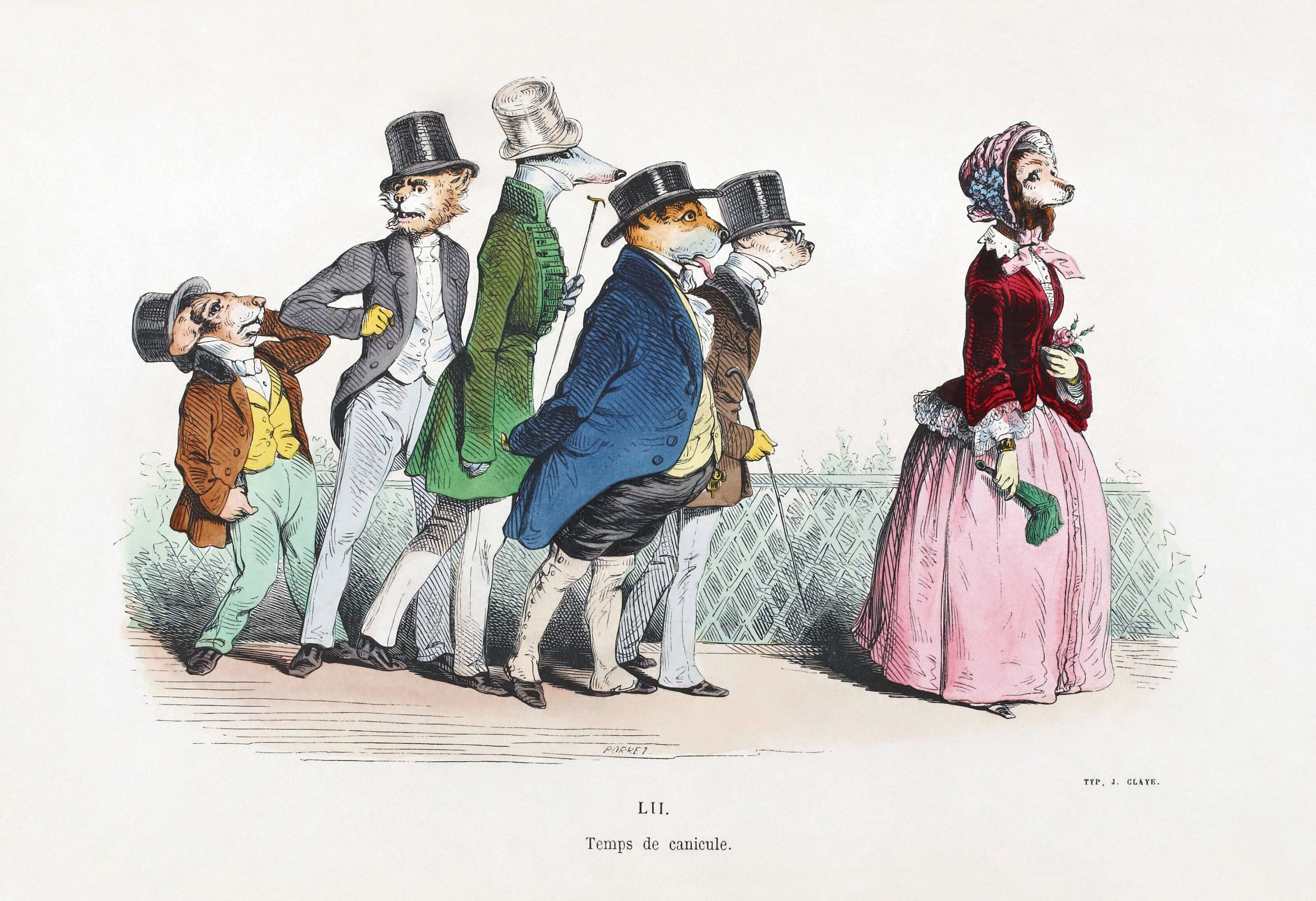
No. 52: Temps de canicule (A Heatwave).

=== The French Revolution of 1830: 1830–1835 ===
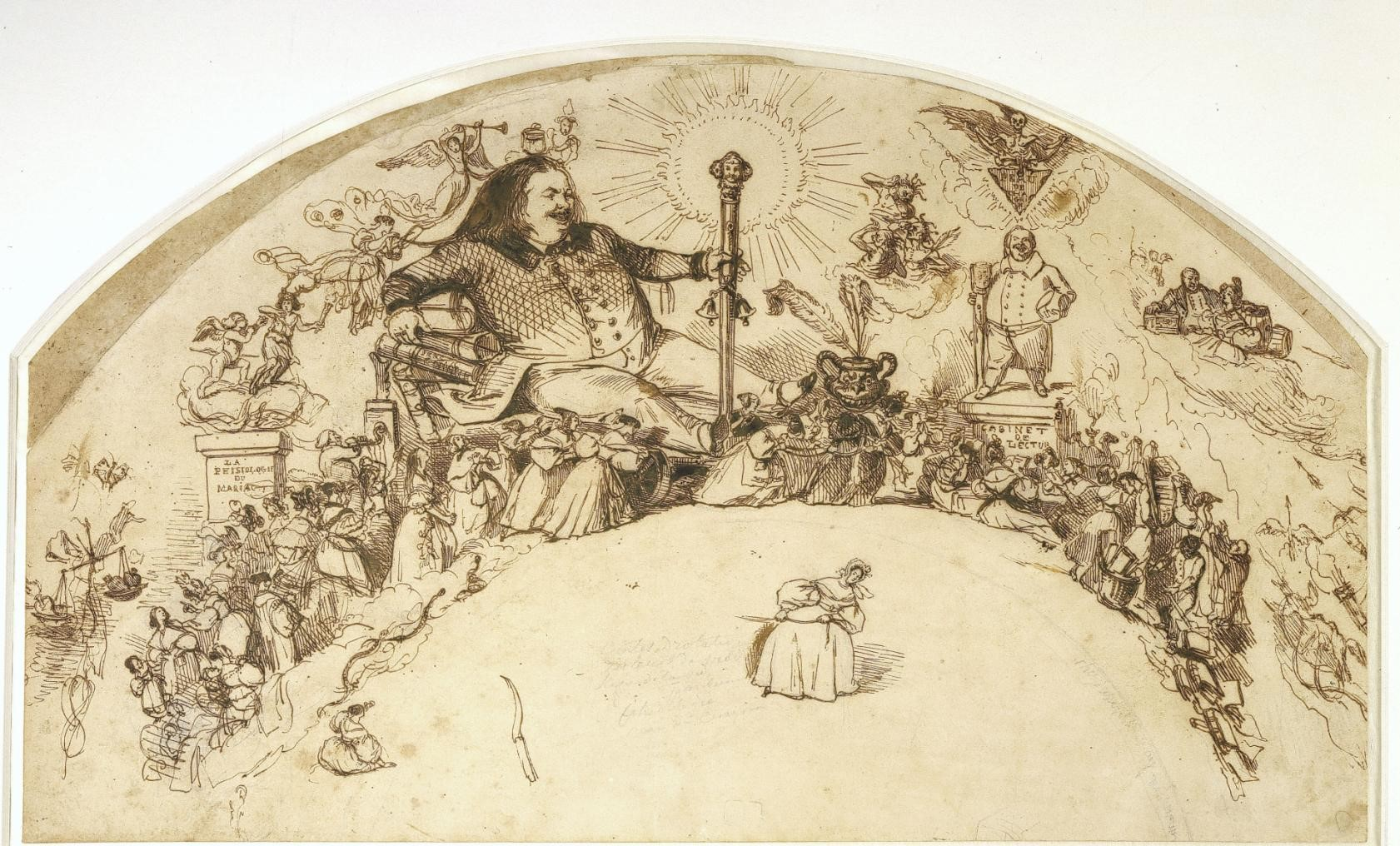
Balzac and the Characters of the Human Comedy. Pen drawing for a fan project (Maison de Balzac, Paris).

In the French Revolution of 1830, the "Three Glorious Days" (July 27–29) saw the liberal, republican, working class of Paris fighting in the streets to bring down the Bourbon monarch Charles X, who was replaced by his more liberally minded cousin Louis Philippe I. These same republican workers were rapidly marginalized as the bourgeoisie appropriated the social, economic, and political gains of the revolution to their own ends. Alexandre Dumas is known to have fought with the workers and it is possible that Grandville and others in his circle participated in the fighting as well. Several satirical republican periodicals begin to emerge in Paris at this time, including La Silhouette, Tribune, La Caricature, L'Artiste, Le Charivari, Corsaire, Réformateur, Bon Sens, Populaire, and others. These papers were often political, provocative, and pressed the issue that the workers had been pivotal in bringing Louis Philippe to power, but were now dismissed by the new monarchy.

The success of Grandville's previous lithographic series led to invitations to design cartoons for these papers. The first of these was the satirical paper La Silhouette where his friend Charles Philipon was working as an editor. Grandville's lithograph Let's Put Out the Light and Rekindle the Fire! ("the light" of the Enlightenment and "the fire" of book-burning), criticizing censorship of the press, was published in June 1830 and quickly proscribed by the government. La Silhouette had a short run (December 1829 – January 1831), folding after the administration's fines and pressure. It was only one in a succession of papers of similar content, many of which buckled under government pressure, and in some cases the same editors, writers, and illustrators moved from one paper to the next.

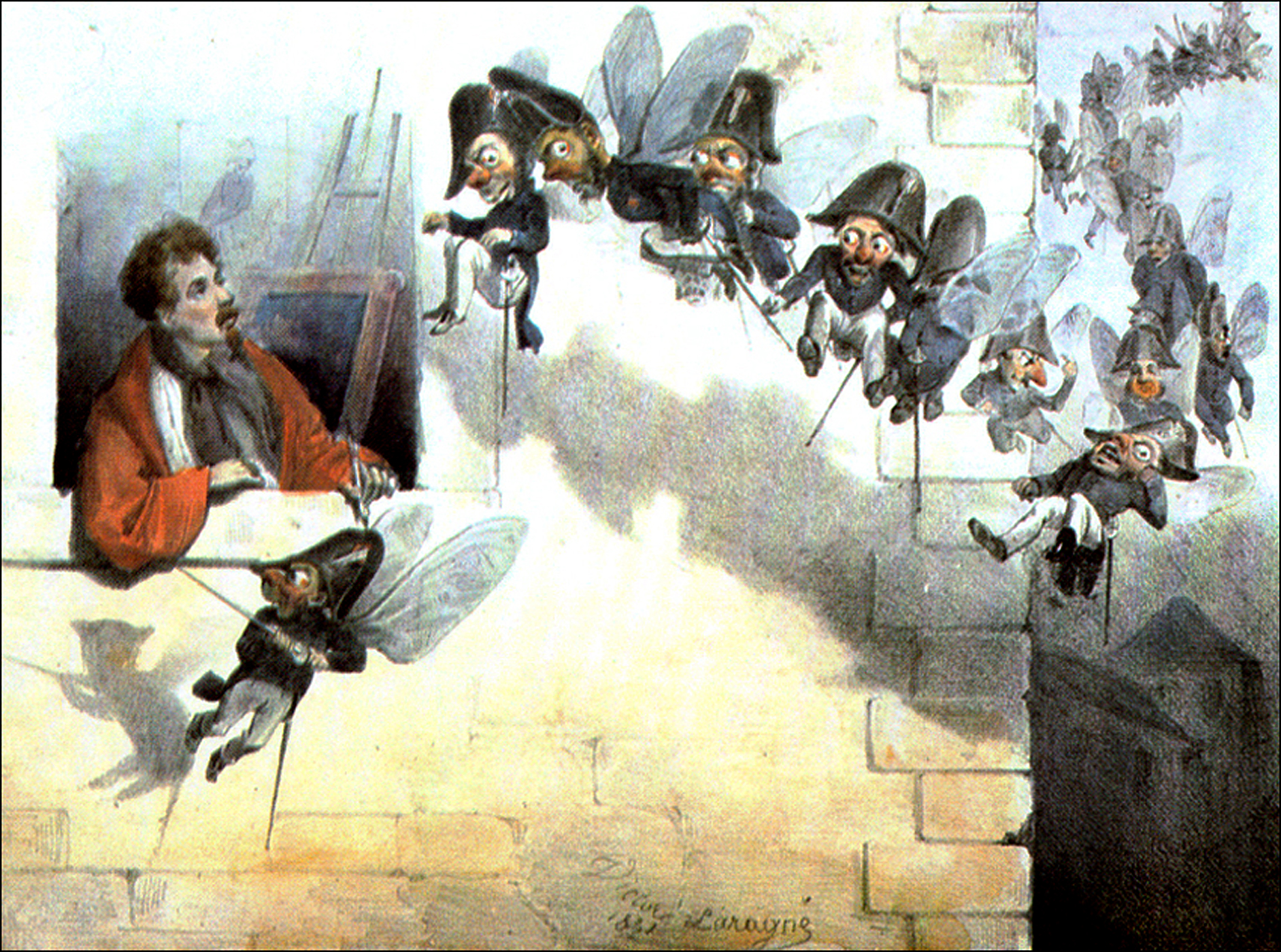
Oh!! These nasty flies!! (c. 1835): Grandville produced this picture of himself in response to threats from the police regarding his cartoons.

Before La Silhouette closed, Charles Philipon and Auguste Audibert founded La Caricature in 1830, with Honoré de Balzac as a literary editor and Grandville, Achille Devéria, Honoré Daumier, Edme Jean Pigal, Auguste Raffet, and Charles-Joseph Traviès de Villers as cartoonist and lithographers. As one author put it "From 1830 to 1835 Philipon and La Caricature waged all-out war against Louis-Philippe." As part of this "war" Grandville designed numerous prints, including multi-part lithographs published over a period of weeks that collectors could piece together into one, e.g. the seven part Grande Croisade contre la Liberté (The Great Crusade Against Liberty) and La Chasse à la Liberté (The Hunters in Pursuit of Liberty). These attacks on monarchy were taken seriously and were not without consequences. Louis Philippe's regime seized papers, levied fines, and sent editors, writers, and illustrators to prison. Daumier was fined 500 francs and spent six months in prison in 1832. Charles Philipon received even greater fines and longer prison terms as did other publishers. Grandville endured persistent harassment from the police, including searches, and one incident described as a mugging in his own building by thuggish policemen, foiled by a neighbor who confronted them with pistols. He is said to have been deeply distressed by these events. Grandville filed criminal charges asserting the police had entered his residence by force, and he later published a lithograph Oh!! Les vilaines mouches!!(Oh!! These nasty flies!! ) Philipon organized L'Association Mensuelle lithographique which offered fine prints to its members in the early 1830s. Grandville produced over half the prints, with the profits going to pay the paper's fines.

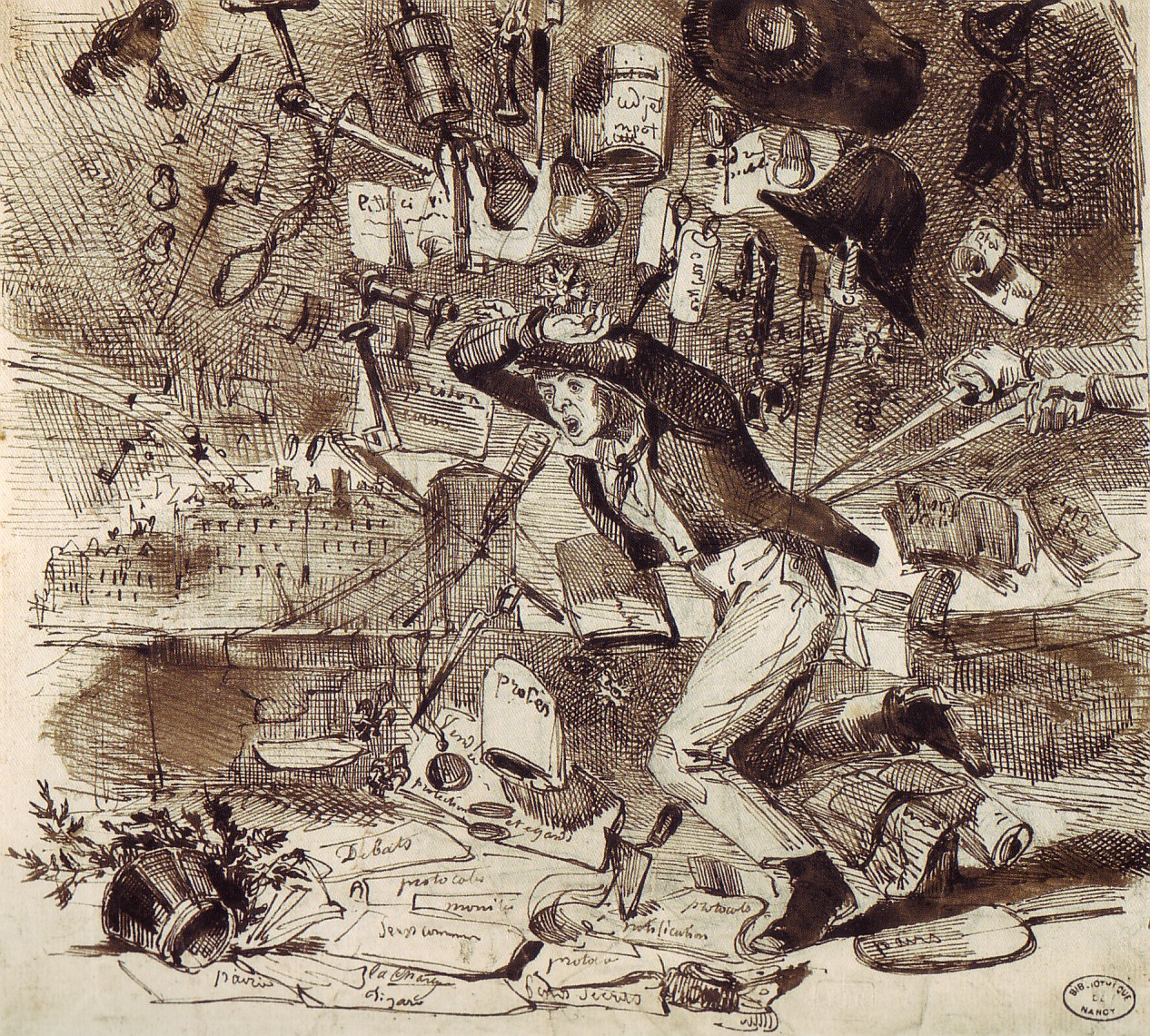
New-Year's Gifts for the People (1833), pen and ink

As La Caricature was collapsing, Philipon launched yet another review, Le Charivari in 1832, in which political attacks were more subtle, oblique, and veiled and the cartoons often addressed broader, less political, social satire. Grandville, Philipon, and Daumier, achieved a level of celebrity status among factions of the public, as much for their defiant opposition as their cartoons. His political cartoons enjoyed great popularity with the public and were held in high regard by many. Publishers and editors such as Edouard Charton of Le magasin pittoresque, as gave Grandville the freedom to choose his own subjects and create his images.

The business of caricaturing was financially tenuous. The papers typically paid cartoonists by the print and artist considered themselves lucky to receive a contract for drawing on a regular basis. Grandville had made his earlier lithographs himself, but after he started producing cartoons for the periodicals about 1831, he typically turned his original drawings over to publishers who had professional lithographers copy his images for printing. Color was sometimes added in colorist studios, almost always women, who applied watercolor or gouache by hand, following notes supplied by the artists.

The "Fieschi attentat", an unsuccessful assassination attempt on King Louis Philippe occurred on July 28, 1835, the fifth anniversary of the July Revolution. The September Laws soon followed, with censorship of the press and significantly longer prison sentences for publishing criticisms of the king and his administration. Caricatures required approval from the government before they were published and the press was forbidden to report on trials involving the press.

Political lithographs (1830–1835)

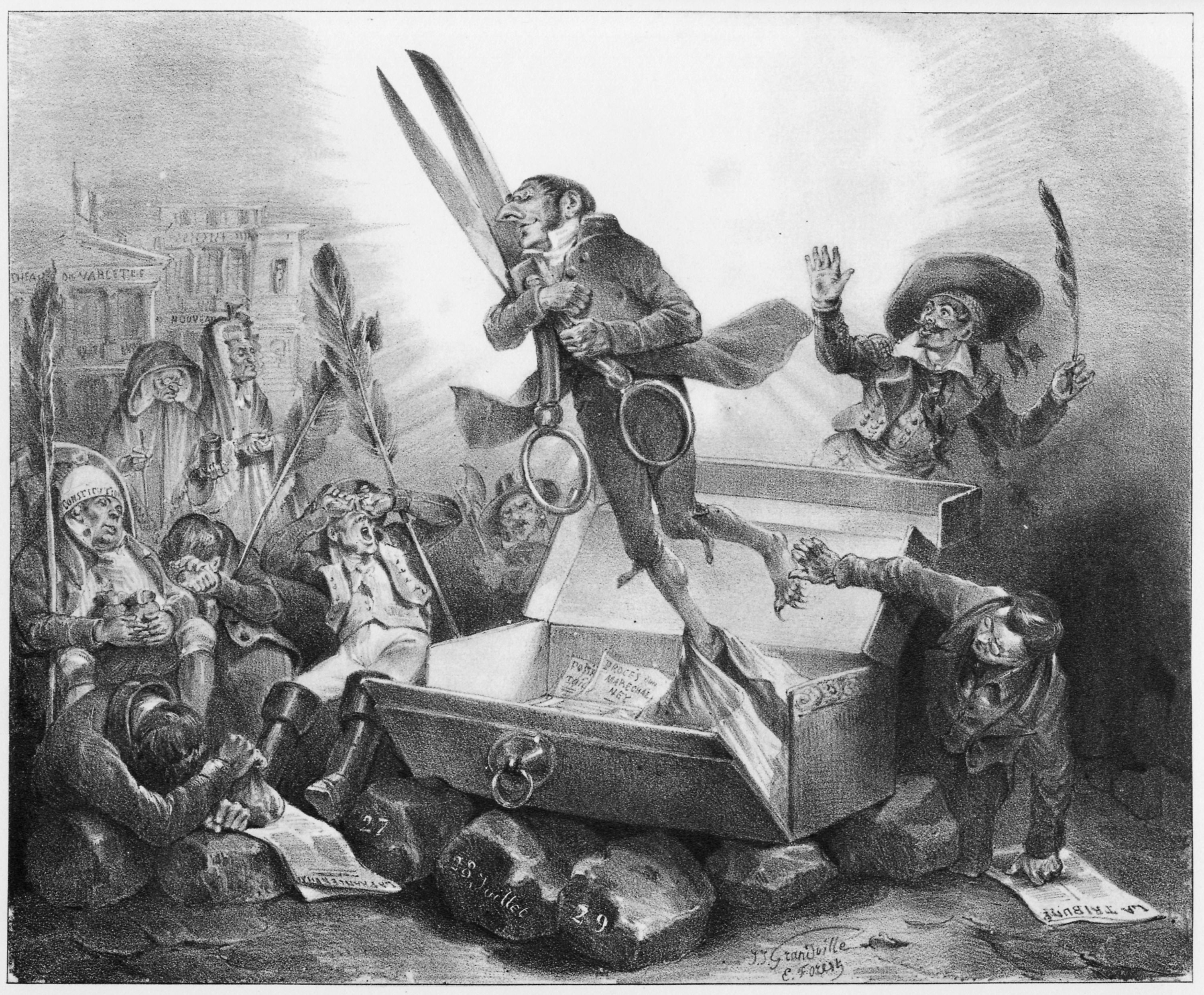
Resurrection of Censorship (1832), La Caricature, No. 62, 21.7 x 26.5 cm

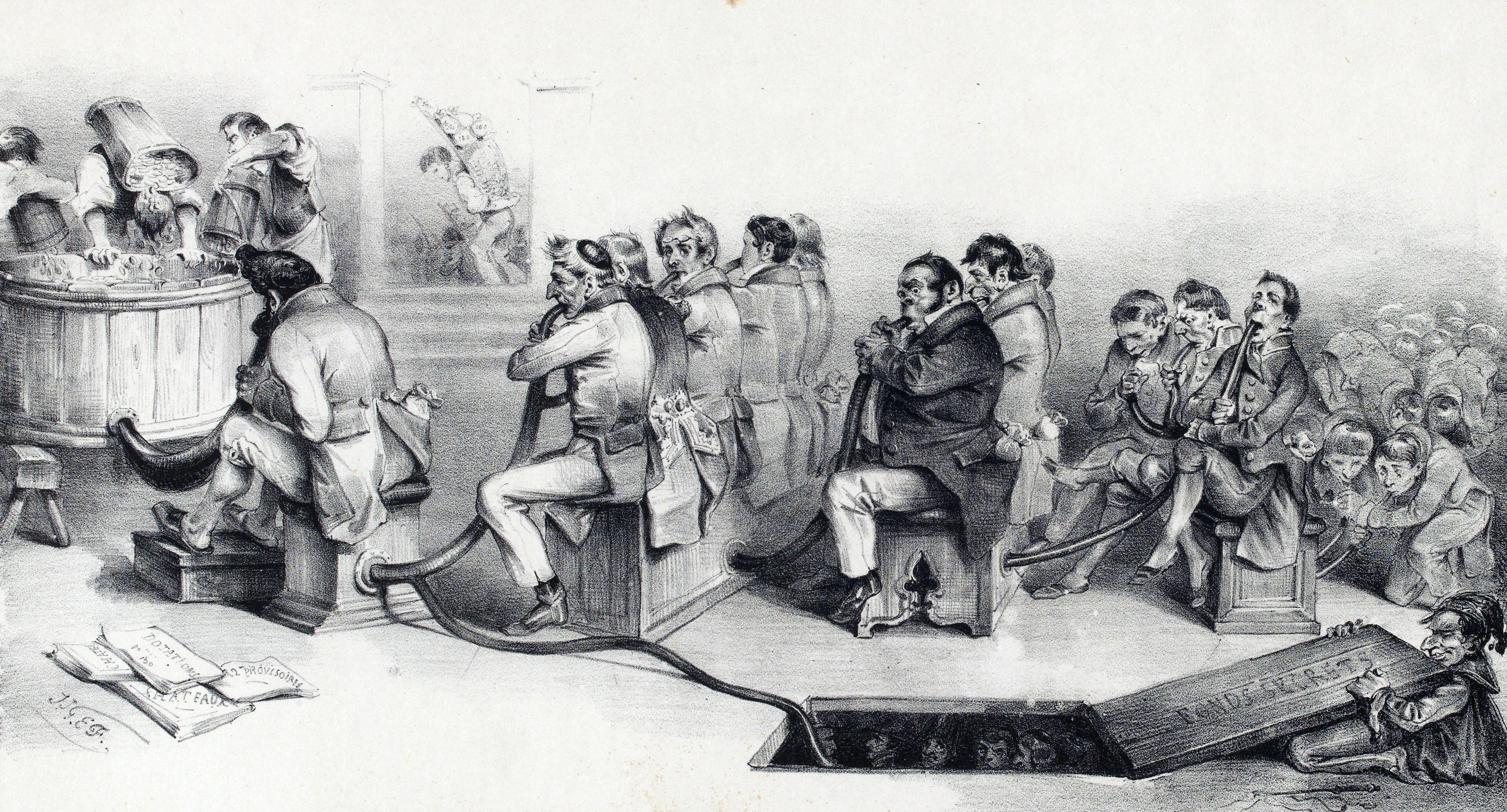
Digestion of the Budget: Administrative, Political, Moral and above all Economic Work (1832), La Caricature, No. 82, 16.7 x 31 cm

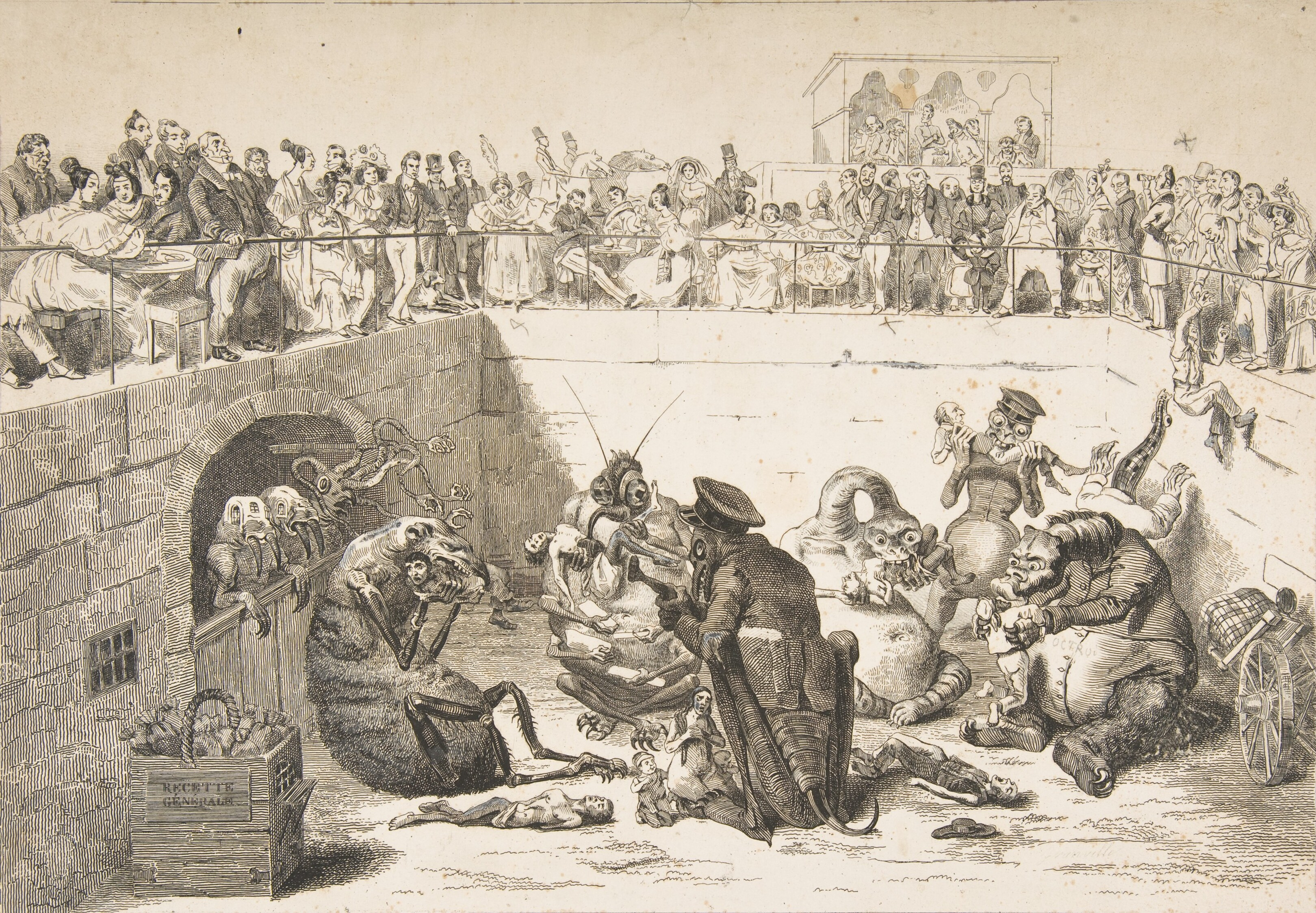
The People Delivered to the Vampire Taxes (1833), L'Association Mensuelle No. 10, 23.4 x 33.7 cm

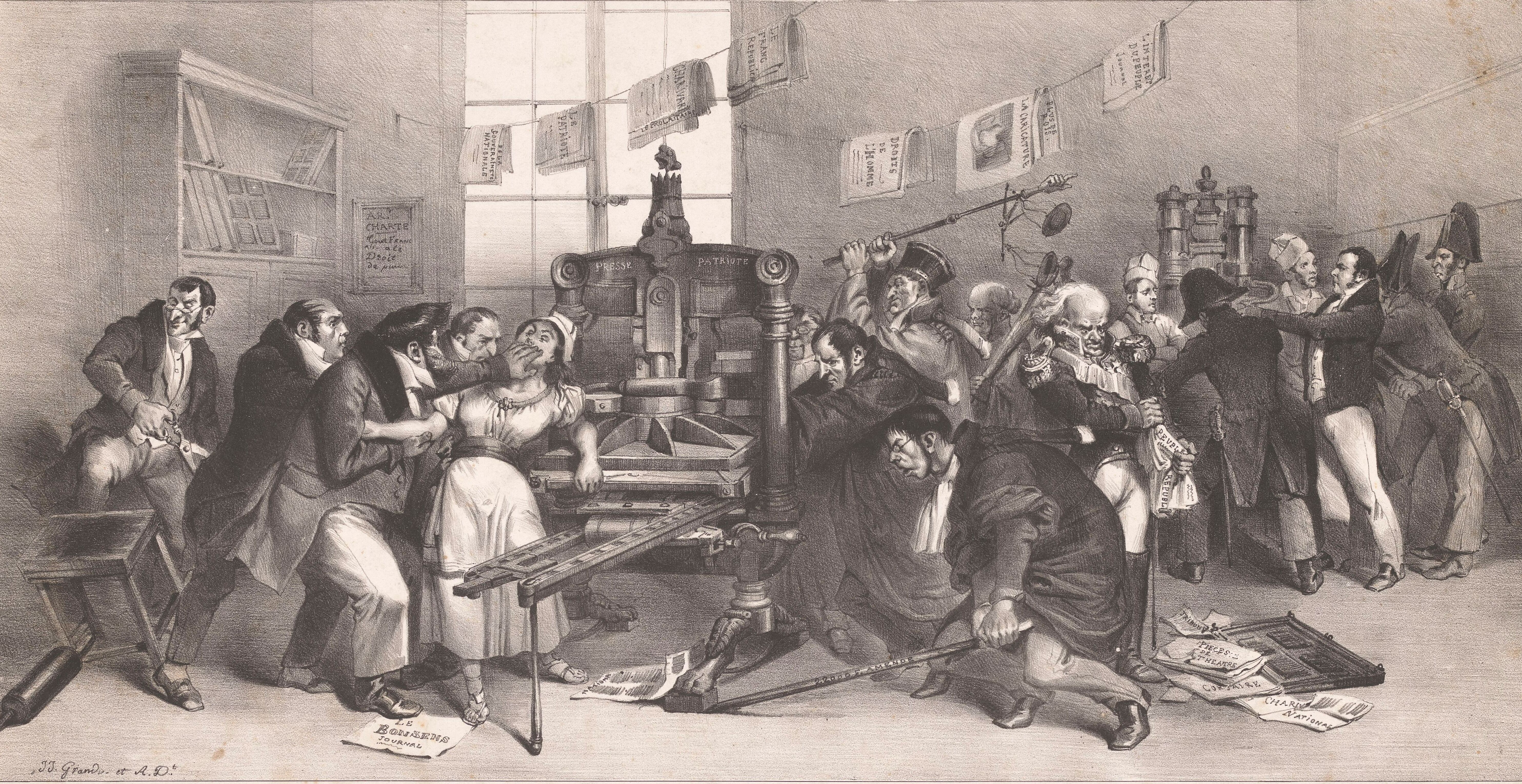
French Government Attack on the Freedom of the Printing Press (1833), La Caricature, 35.4 x 53.3 cm

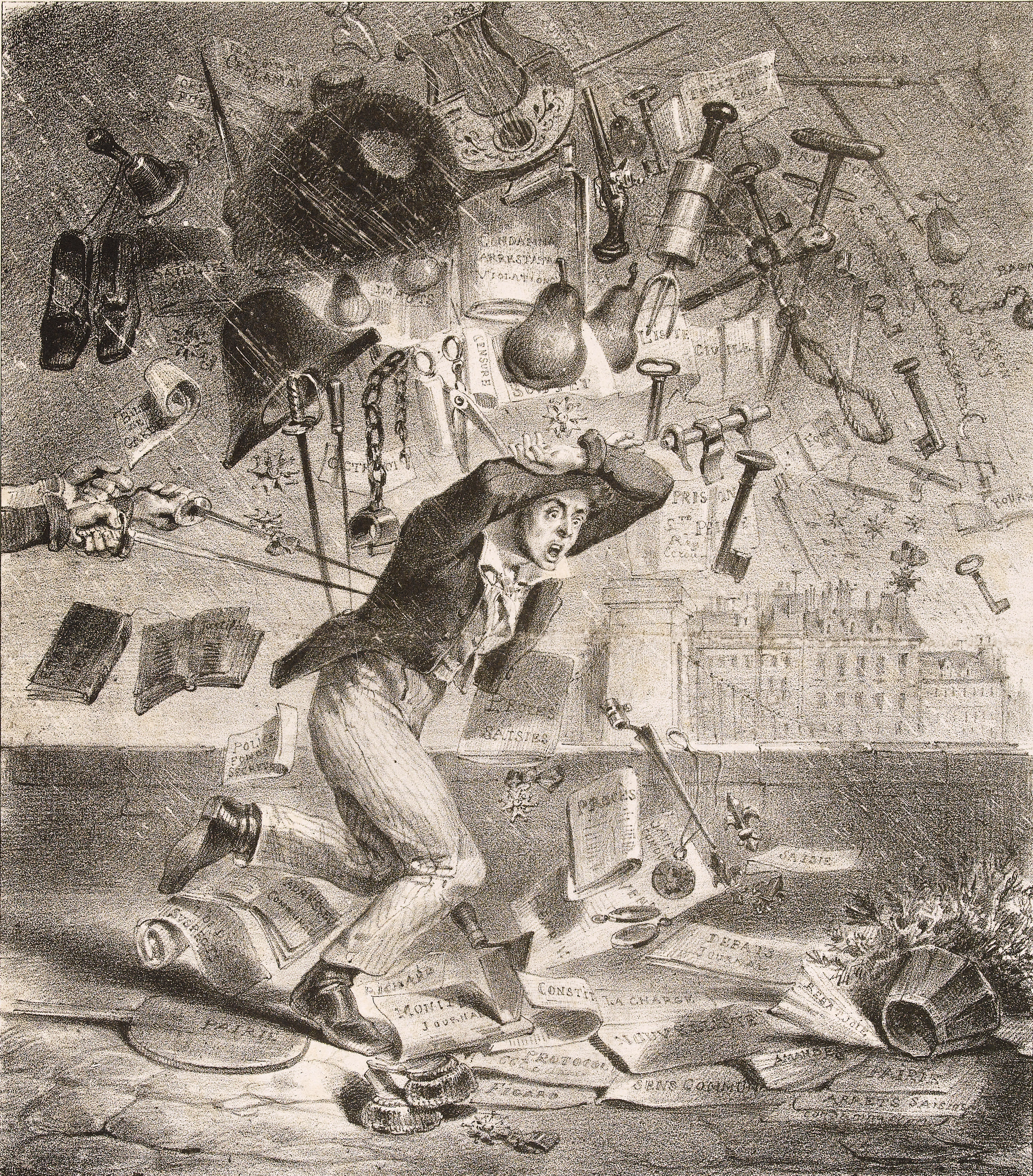
Gifts to the People (1833), La Caricature, No. 113, 23.4 x 20.4

=== Later career: 1836–1847 ===
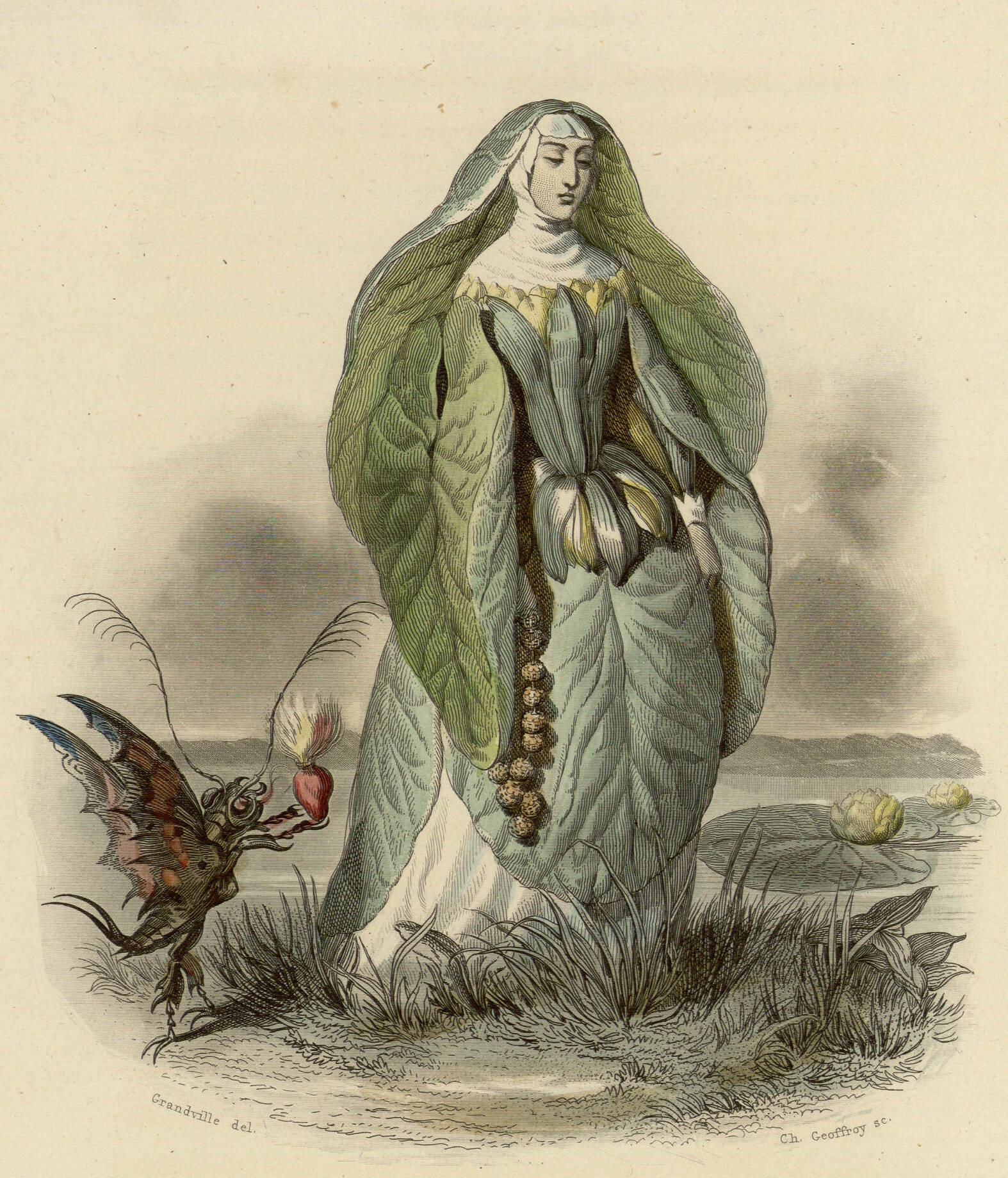
Water lily (1846), from Les fleurs animées (Animated Flowers or Flowers Personified)

At the outbreak of the July Revolution of 1830, Grandville was a 26-year-old bachelor living a bohemian life. By the time the September Laws were passed in 1835, he was a 31-year-old husband, and a father. He quit producing political cartoons after the September Laws and turned to illustrating books. It has been postulated that he was relieved and even happy to leave the politics and police harassment behind at this point in his life. In July 1833 he married a cousin from Nancy, Marguerite Henriette Fischer and the couple maintained an apartment close to his studio, and rented a house near the outskirts of town. In 1834 their first son Ferdinand was born. A second son, Henri, was born in fall of 1838, but tragedy soon struck the family. Marguerite's health is said to have declined with each birth and Ferdinand died of meningitis about the time Henri was born. In 1841 Henri choked to death on a piece of bread while his parents helplessly watched. A third son, Georges, was born in July 1842 but, Marguerite died of peritonitis later that month. Grandville remarried in October 1843 to Catherine Marceline Lhuillier (1819–1888) who was the mother of his fourth son Armand, born in 1845. One source states that from her deathbed, his first wife Marguerite, had a hand in selecting Catherine as a second wife and stepmother for her husband and son.

The first major undertaking in book illustration that Grandville undertook was a volume of song lyrics by the popular French songwriter Pierre-Jean de Béranger, first published with 38 wood engravings in 1835, and an expanded edition with 100 engravings in 1837. This was followed by several volumes of classic literature, including as La Fontaine's Fables, Defoe's Robinson Crusoe, Swift's Gulliver's Travels, Boccaccio's The Decameron, and Cervantes's Don Quixote. While his illustrations for classic prose include some fine, if conventional illustrations, they did not provide him with the opportunity to give free range to his imagination. He had a greater affinity for children's literature, that shows in his illustration for La Fontaine Fables, and later the Fables of Lavalette and Florian, collectively ranking among his finest work. He made a series of drawings for Perrault's Little Red Riding Hood but these were not published.

Grandville adapted and refined his style in switching from cartoons to book illustrations, which coincided with the evolving printing technology and a shift from lithography to wood engraving. Previously, illustrations were typically printed on separate pages that were inserted into the text. With end-cut wood engravings, fine detail could be achieved on the hard end grain of wooden blocks, that could then be placed with the typographical blocks and printed on the same page with the text, lowering cost, and increasing the speed and quality of illustrated texts. Wood engravings also deteriorate less quickly than metal plates used for intaglio printing. Grandville did not engrave the wooden blocks himself. Typical of 19th century illustrators, he provided his original drawings to his publishers which were then carved by professional engravers for his book illustrations.

Book illustrations (after 1836) wood engravings

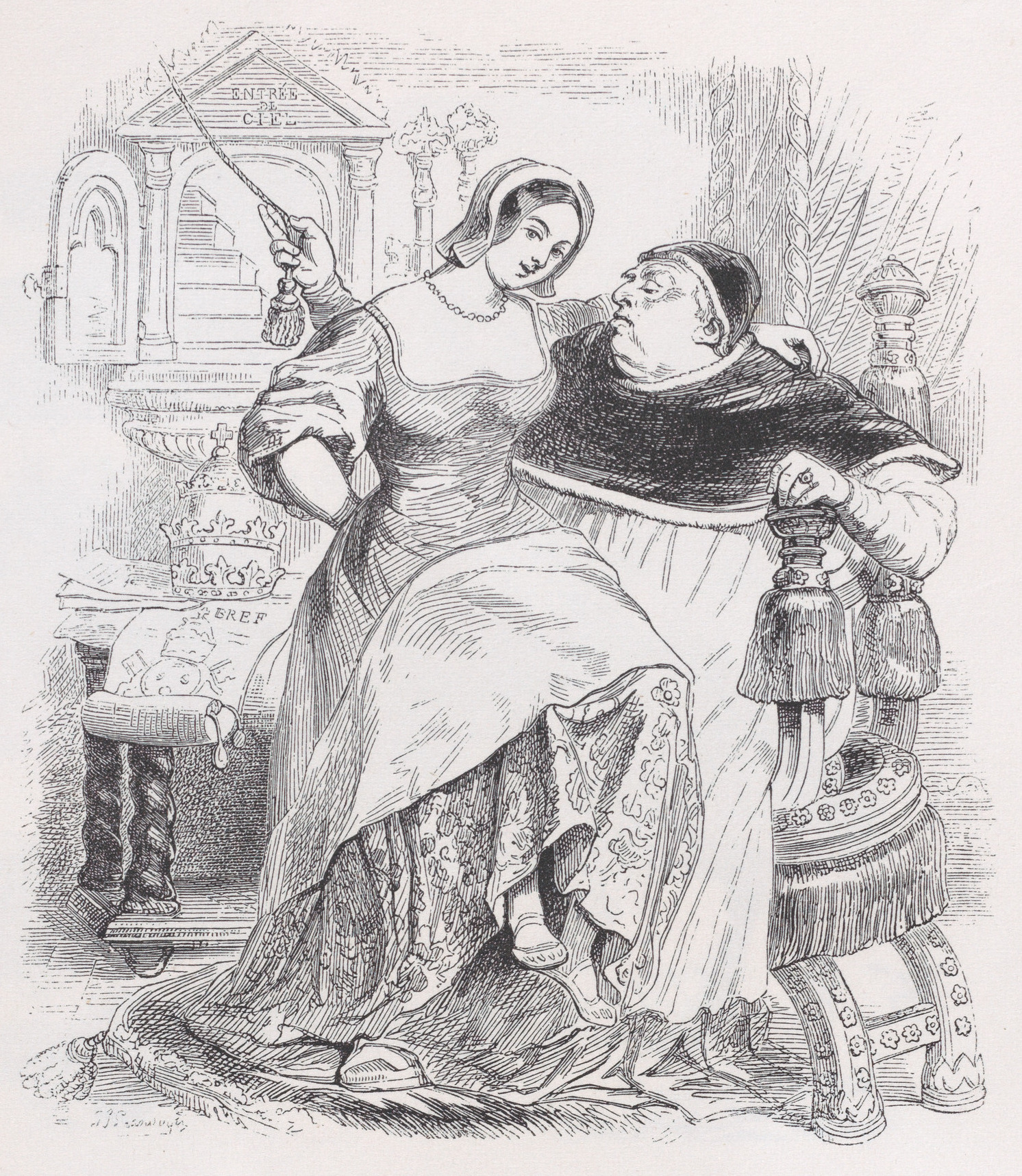
The Good Pope, Complete Works of Béranger (1836)

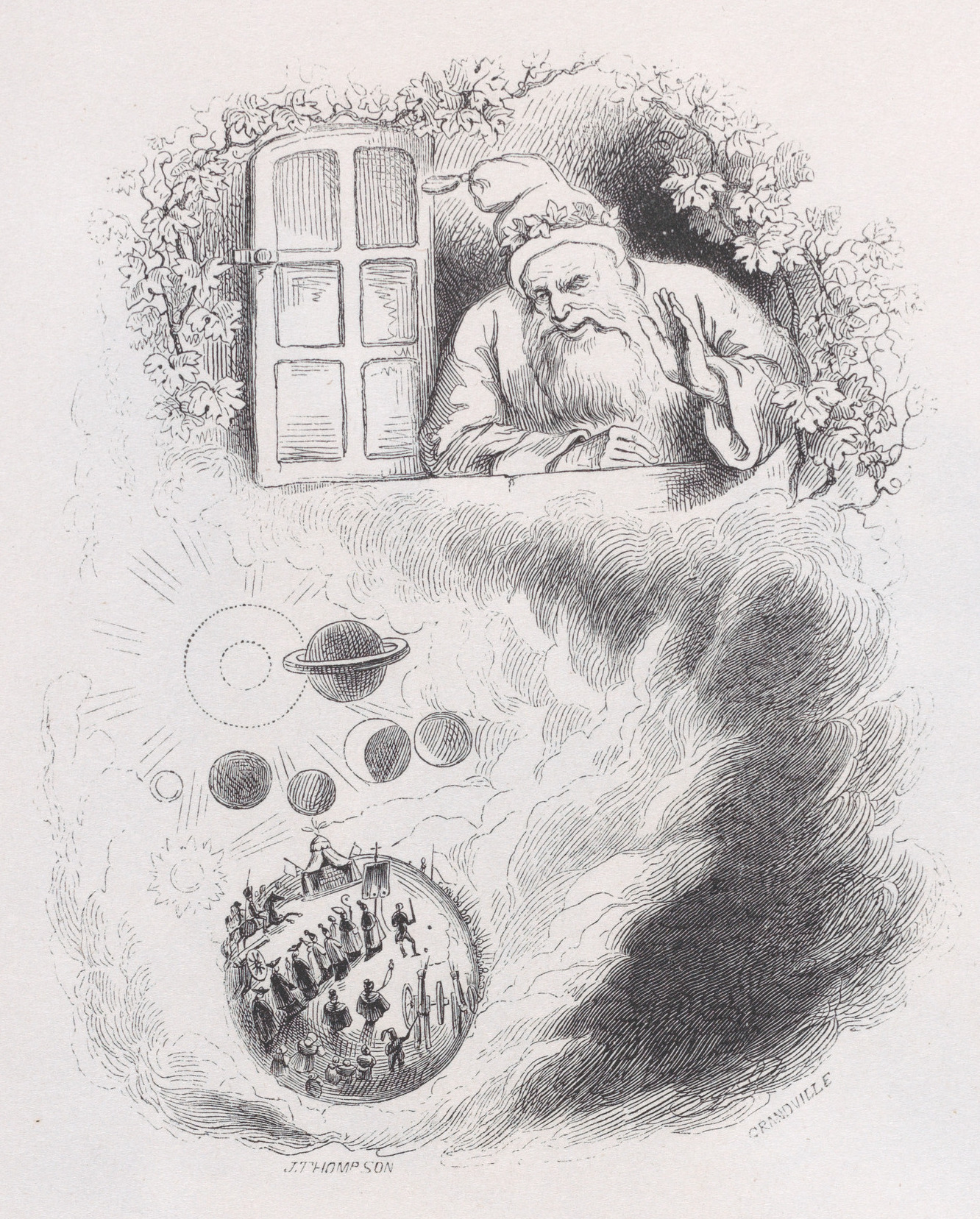
The Good God, Complete Works of Béranger (1836)

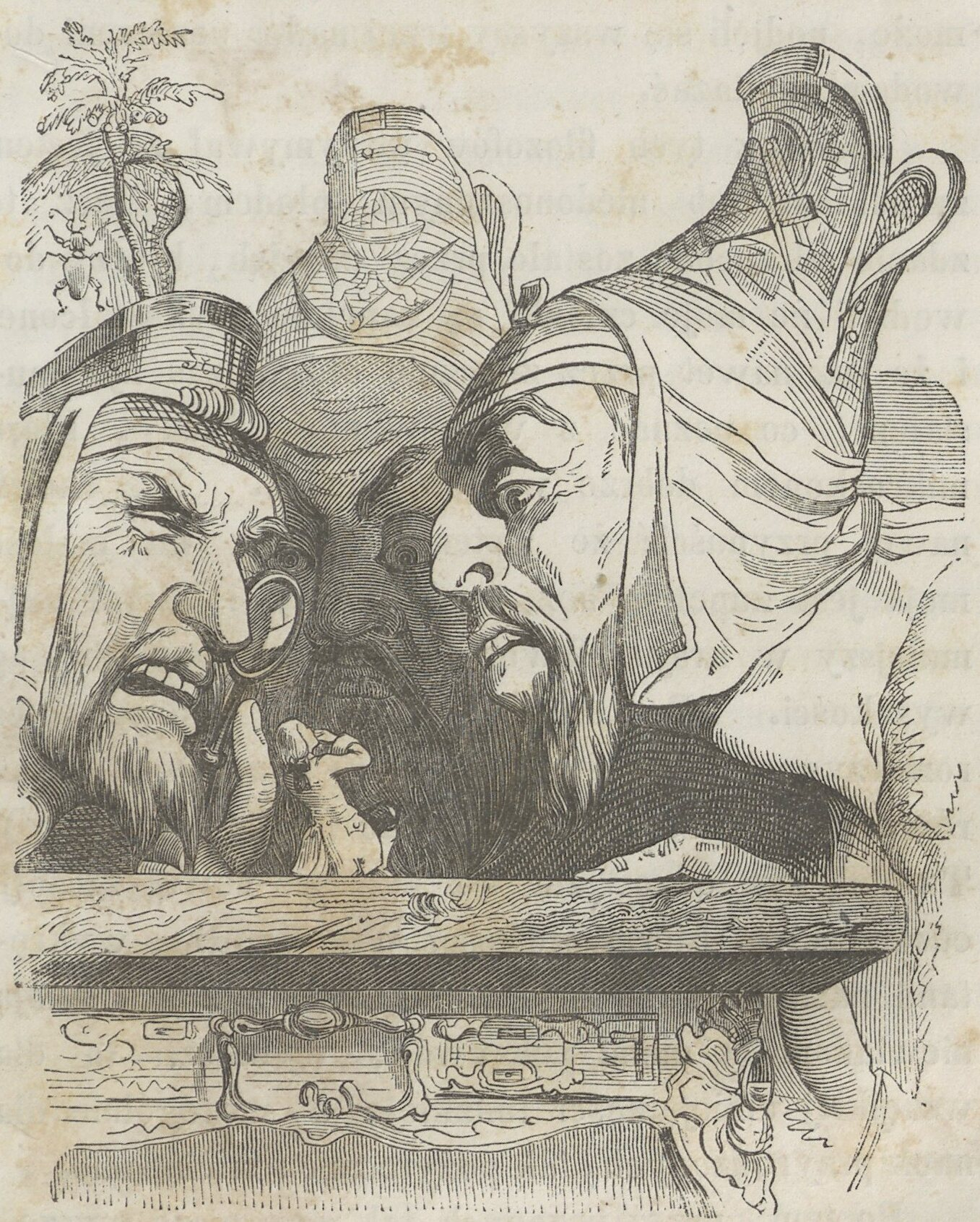
Giants look at Gulliver, Gulliver's Travels (1838)

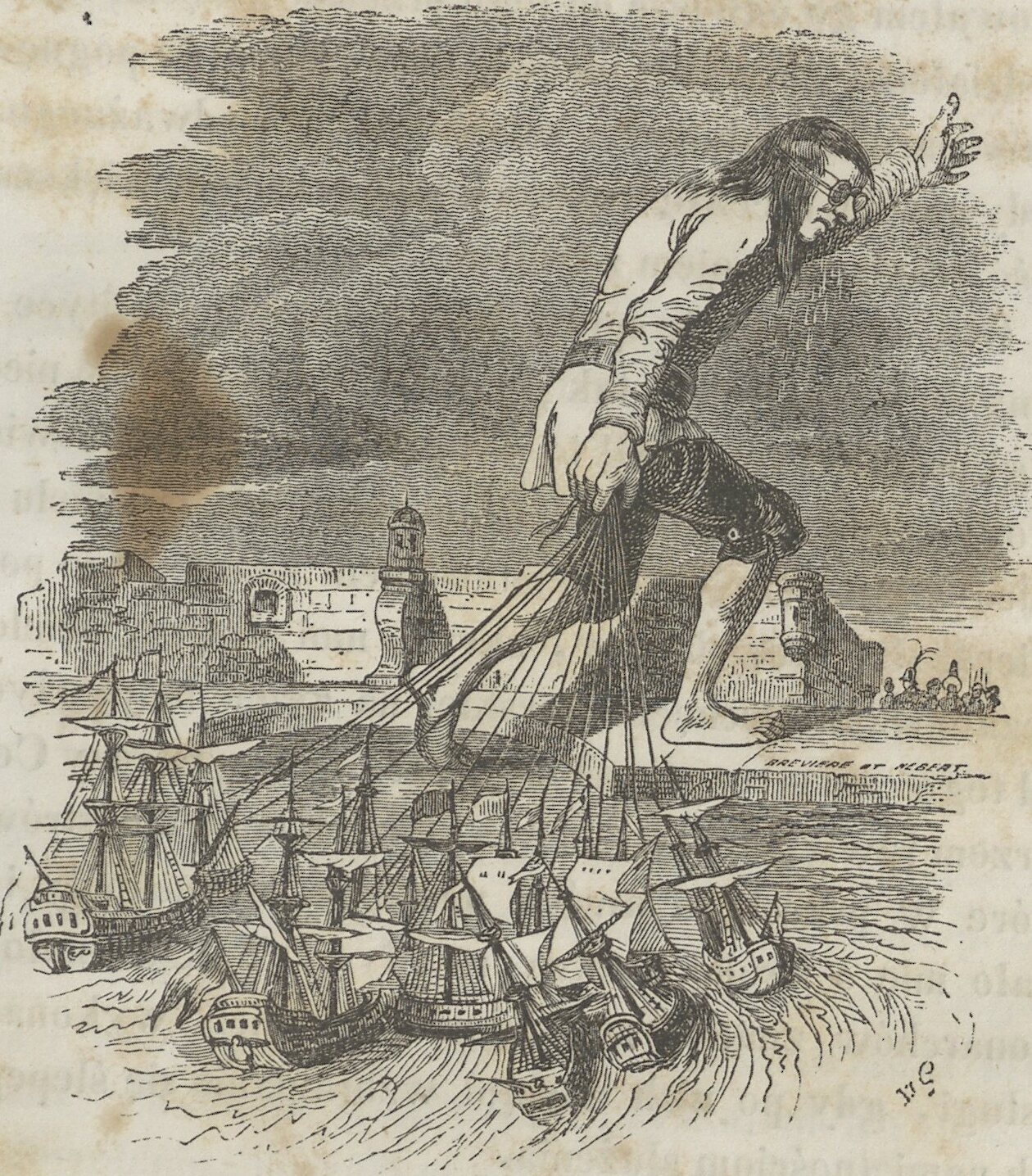
Gulliver pulling the fleet, Gulliver's Travels (1838)

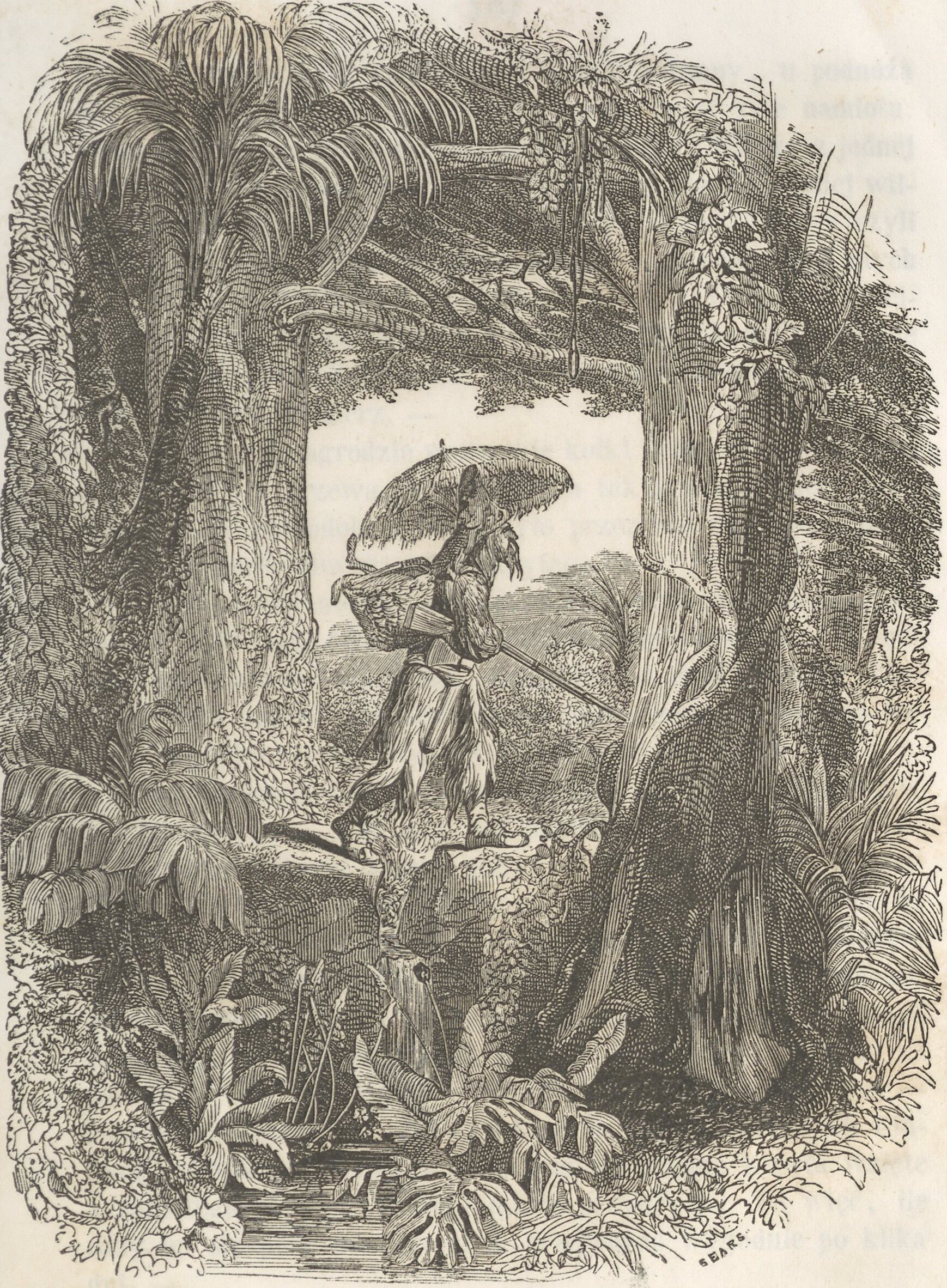
My journey began, Robinson Crusoe (1840)

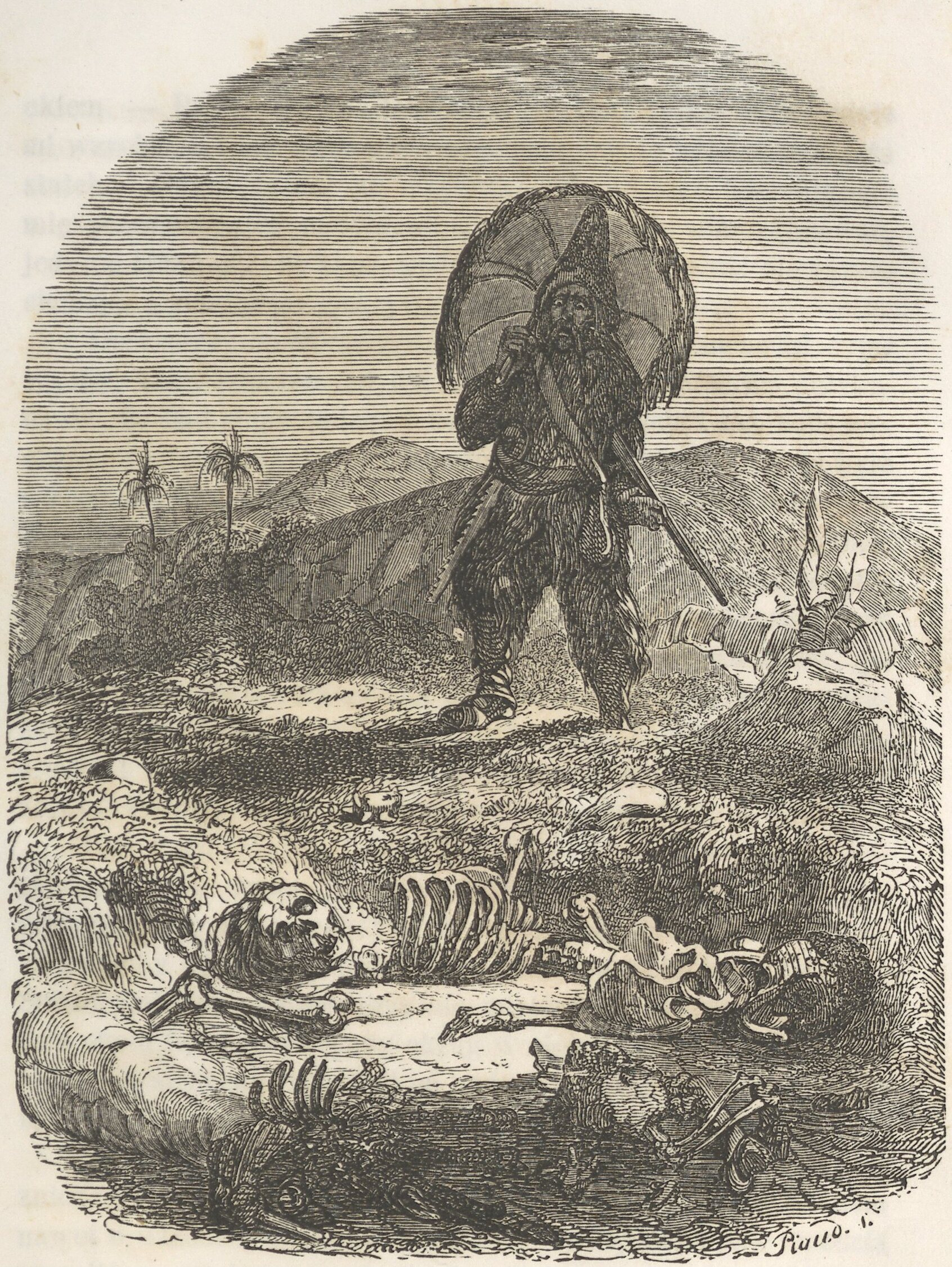
At the foot of the hill, Robinson Crusoe (1840)

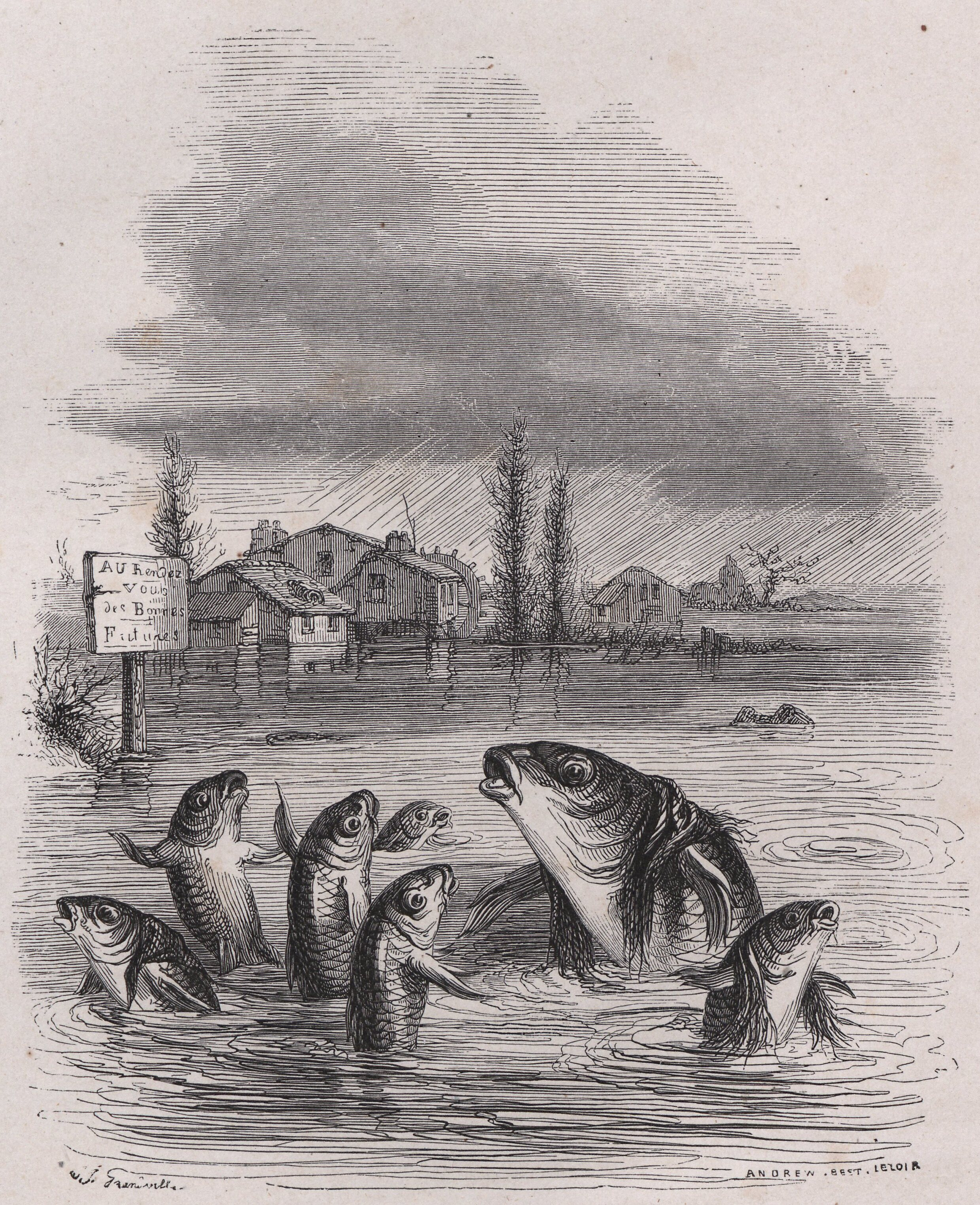
The Carp and the Carpillons, Fables de Florian (1842)

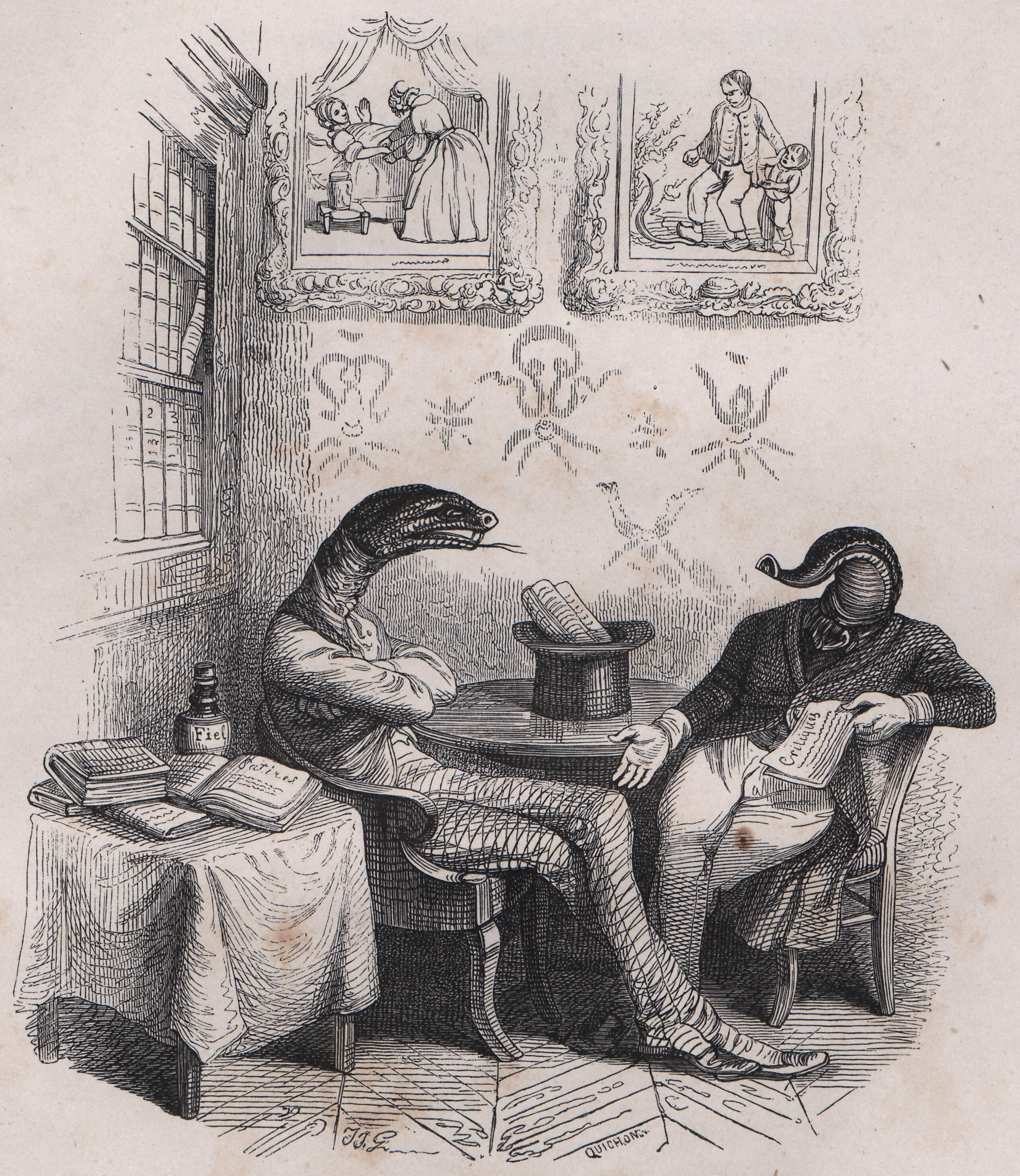
The Viper and the Leech, Fables de Florian (1842)

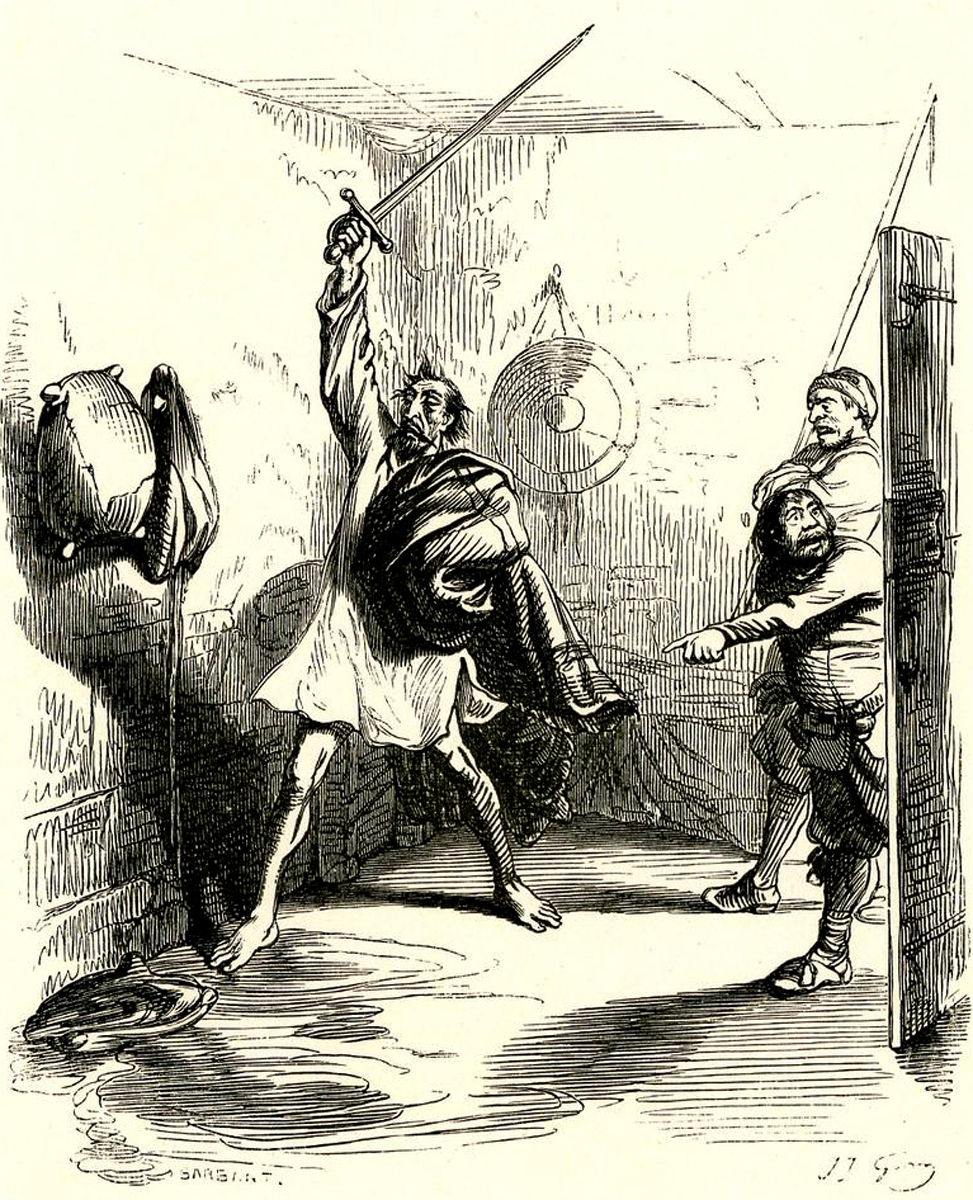
Don Quixote's fight with the red wine skins (1847)

By the early 1840s, Grandville was increasingly illustrating books that were centered around his images. Working in collaboration with publishers and contemporary Parisian writers, he was at times given free regain of his imagination and the images. He produced about one book a year, his name often appearing before the authors on the title page, in which his illustrations were equally as important as the text, if not the main focus of the book. Not surprisingly some of his finest work and that for which he is best remembered today appeared in this period. Most of the authors he worked with had some past connections or background with the radical press of the early 1830s. The first was Scènes de la vie privée et publique des animaux (Scenes of the Private and Public Life of Animals), a satirical compilation of articles and short stories, first published in serial form over a couple of years, then in a two volume set in 1842, with 320 wood engravings by Grandville. Multiple authors contributed to the books including Honoré de Balzac, Louis-François L'Héritier, Alfred de Musset, Paul de Musset, Charles Nodier, and Louis Viardot.

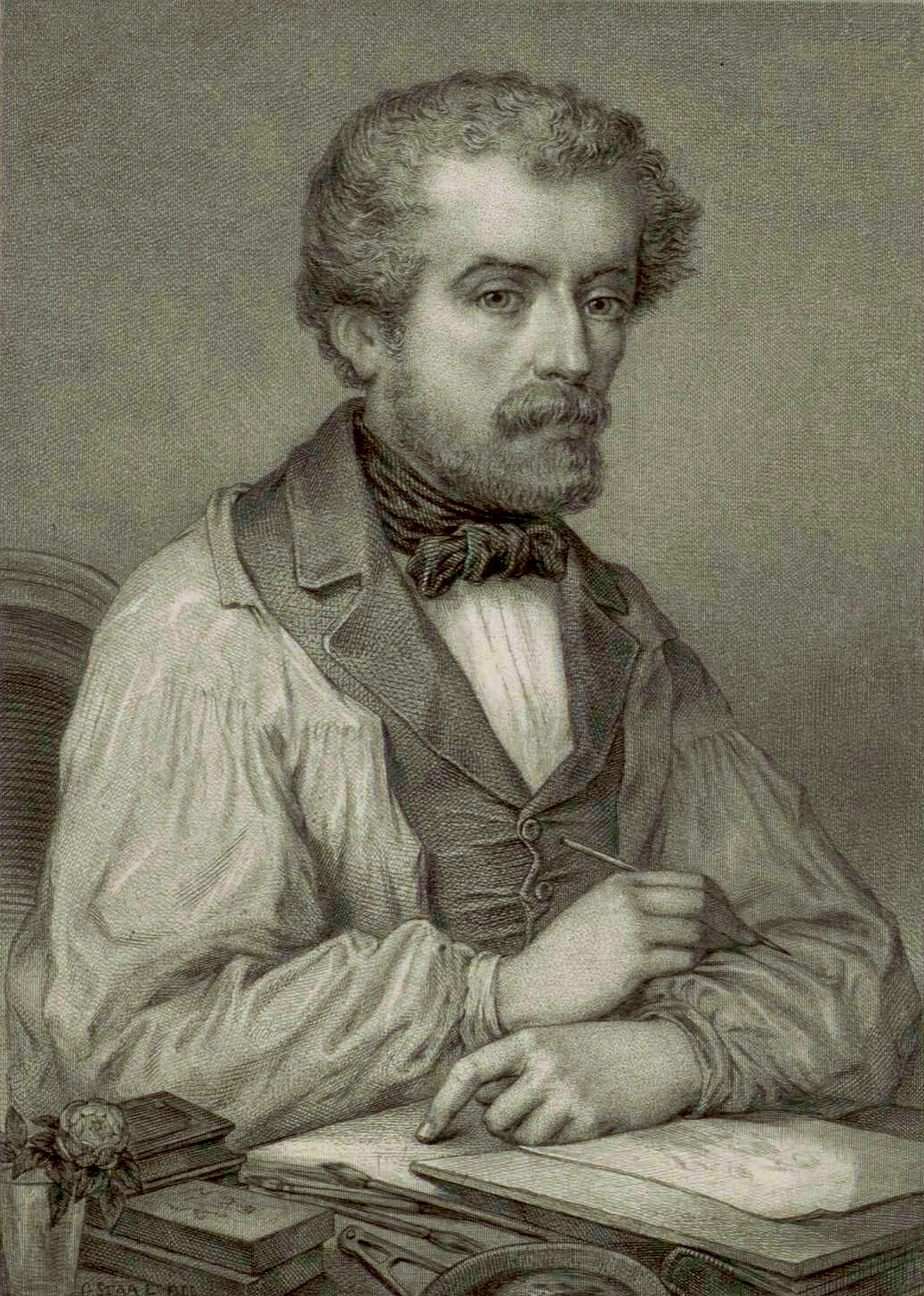
A posthumous portrait of Grandville by Pierre-Gustave Staal (c. 1850), engraving, 28.4 x 19 cm

This was followed by Petites misères de la vie humaine (Little Miseries of Human Life) in 1843, with text by Paul-Émile Daurand-Forgues, a contributor to Le Charivari who sometimes published under the pseudonym "Old Nick". Old Nick also coauthored Cent proverbes: têxte par trois Tetes dans un bonnet (One Hundred Proverbs: Text by Three Heads in a Bonnet) with Taxile Delord and Louis Amédée Achard in 1845. Taxile Delord provided the text for Un autre monde (Another World) in 1844, regarded by many as Grandville's masterpiece and ironically the least successful volume in his lifetime. Delord, a writer and critic who was editor-in-chief of Le Charivari and later entered French politics, also wrote Les fleurs animées (Animated Flowers or Flowers Personified), completed in 1846 and published posthumously. Jérôme Paturot à la recherche d'une position sociale (Jérôme Paturot in Search of a Social Position), a social satire by Marie Roch Louis Reybaud published in 1846 and a great success, was the last book completed and published in his lifetime.

A romanticized myth emerged around Grandville's death that persisted for 150 years or more. Traditional accounts asserted Grandville's bizarre imagery was symptomatic of a disturbed mind, and the death of his family left him gray-haired and hunchbacked by the time he was forty, ultimately sending him over the edge into madness, and he died in an insane asylum. However, recent scholarship does not support this tale. In the days and weeks before his death Grandville was still producing some of his finest drawings, such as Crime and Expiation, and his correspondence with publishers reflect a clear and rational mind anticipating future projects. By all accounts the sudden illness and death of his third son George affected him deeply, some saying this occurred "around late 1846 or early 1847", others place it only three days before his own death. On March 1, 1847, Grandville begin suffering from a sore throat and his condition progressively deteriorated over the following weeks. It has been speculated he had diphtheria. He was eventually taken to a private clinic, 8 Maison de Santé in Vanves, where Felix Voisin and Jean-Pierre Falret, two innovative psychiatrists worked. He died there on March 17, 1847 and was buried in the Cimetière Nord of Saint-Mandé of Paris next to his first wife and three sons. The artist wrote his own epitaph, translations vary: "Here lies Grandville; he loved everything, made everything live, speak, and walk, but he could not make a way for himself." or "Here lies J. J. Grandville. He could bring anything to life and, like God, he made it live, talk and walk. Only one thing eluded him: how to live a life of his own."

Later work (1840s), wood engravings

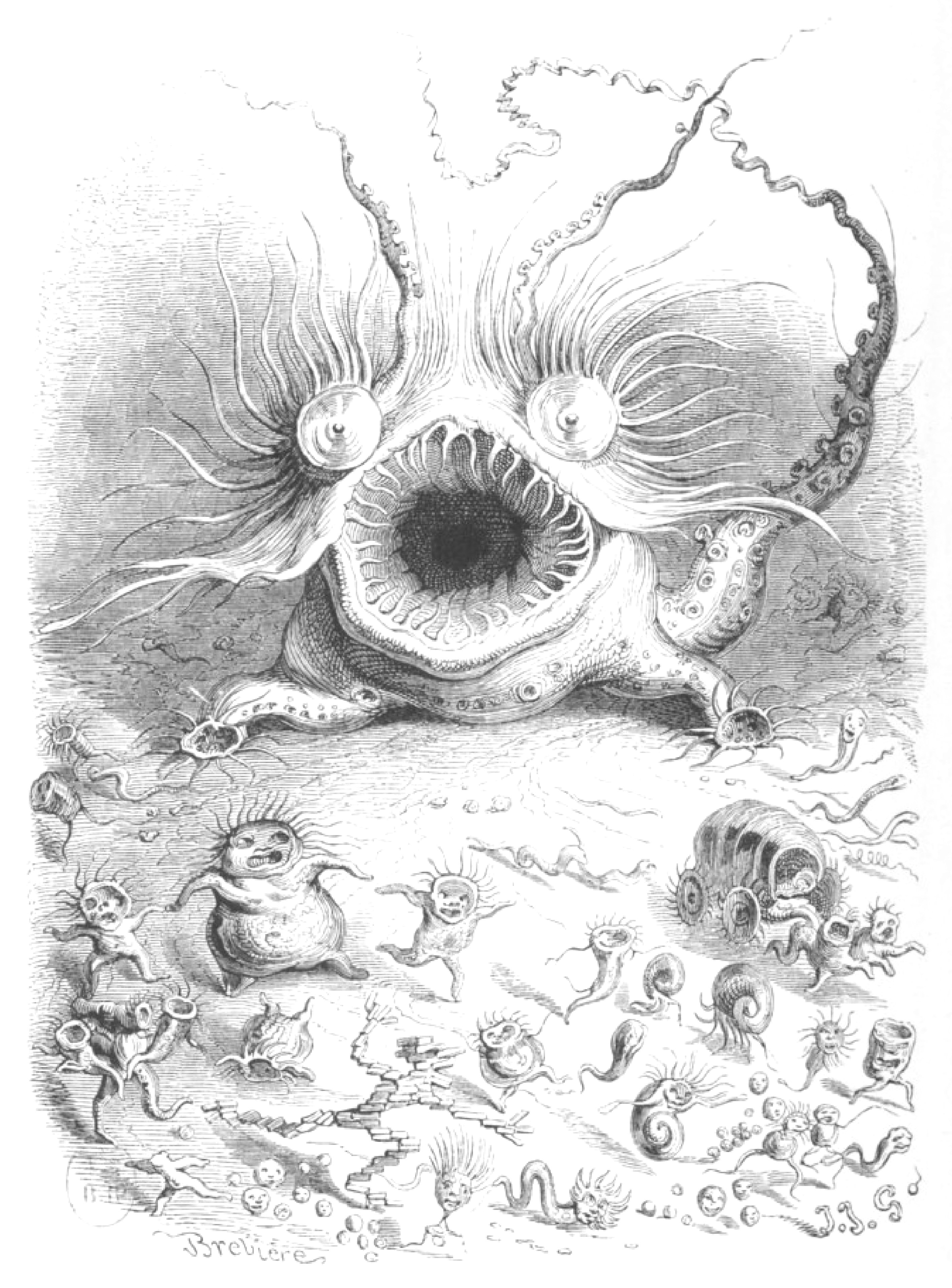
The Garden of Beast: from Scènes de la vie des animaux (1842)

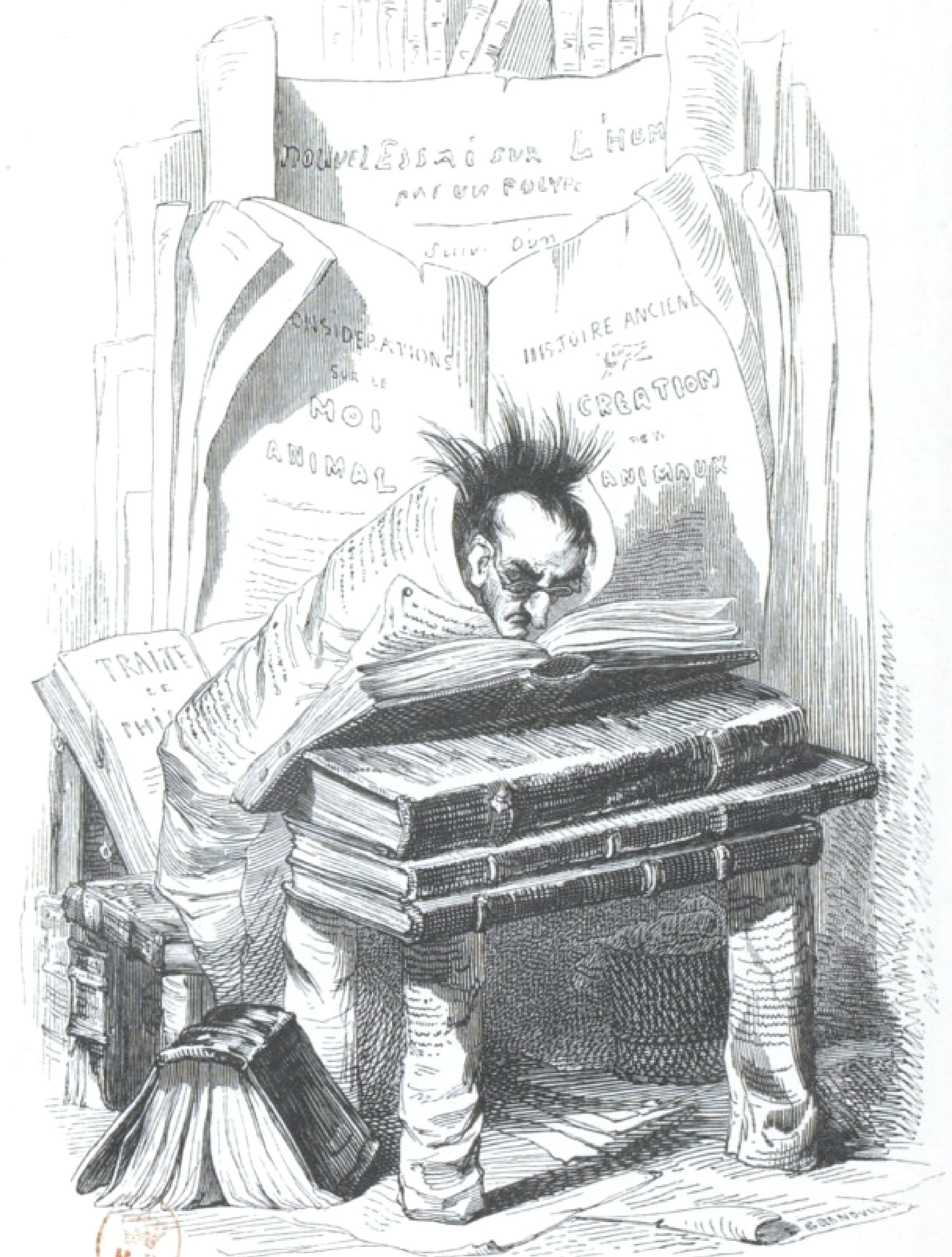
He spins his cocoon and buries in a book: Scènes de la vie des animaux

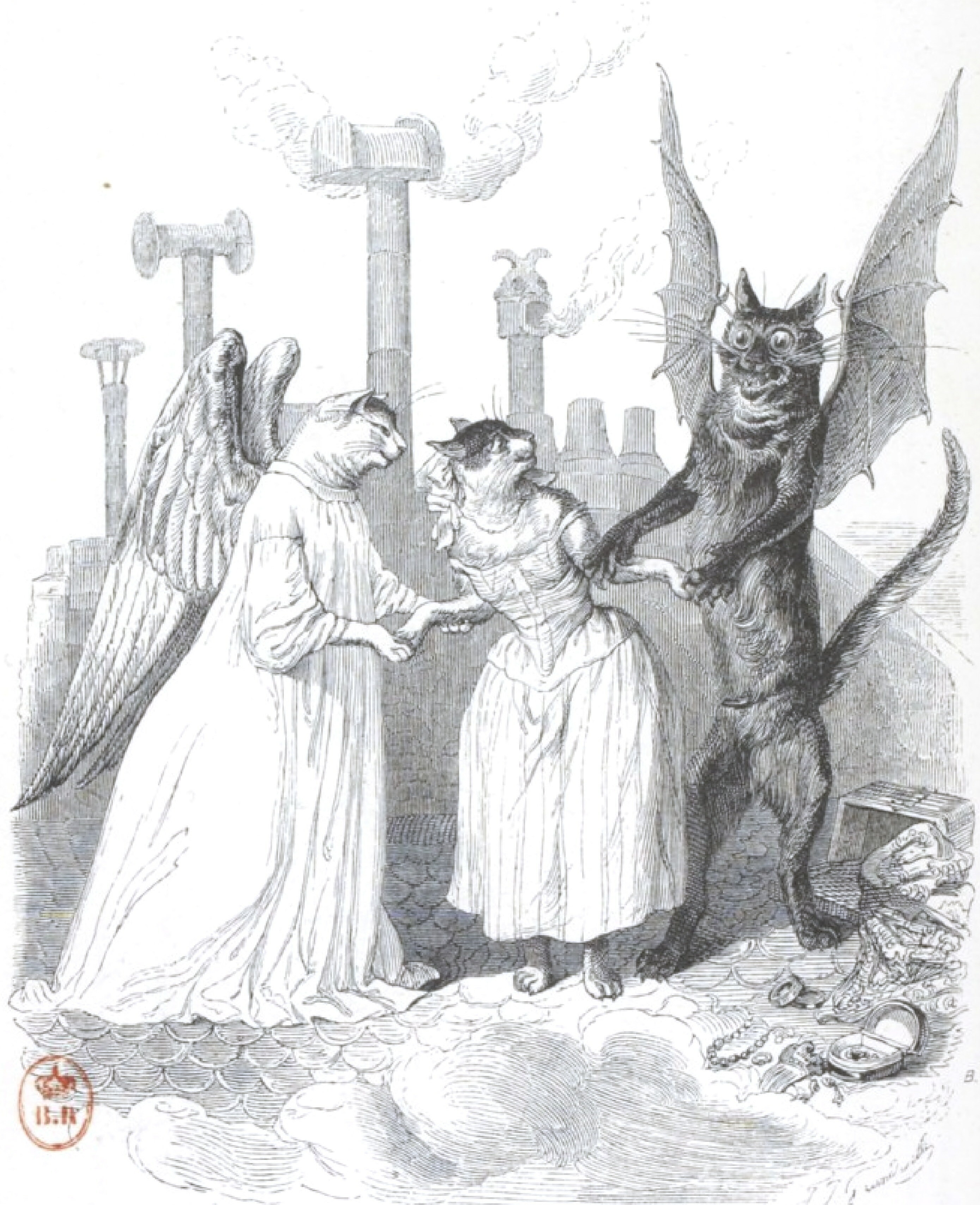
Follow me! said a voice, my bad side no doubt: Scènes de la vie des animaux

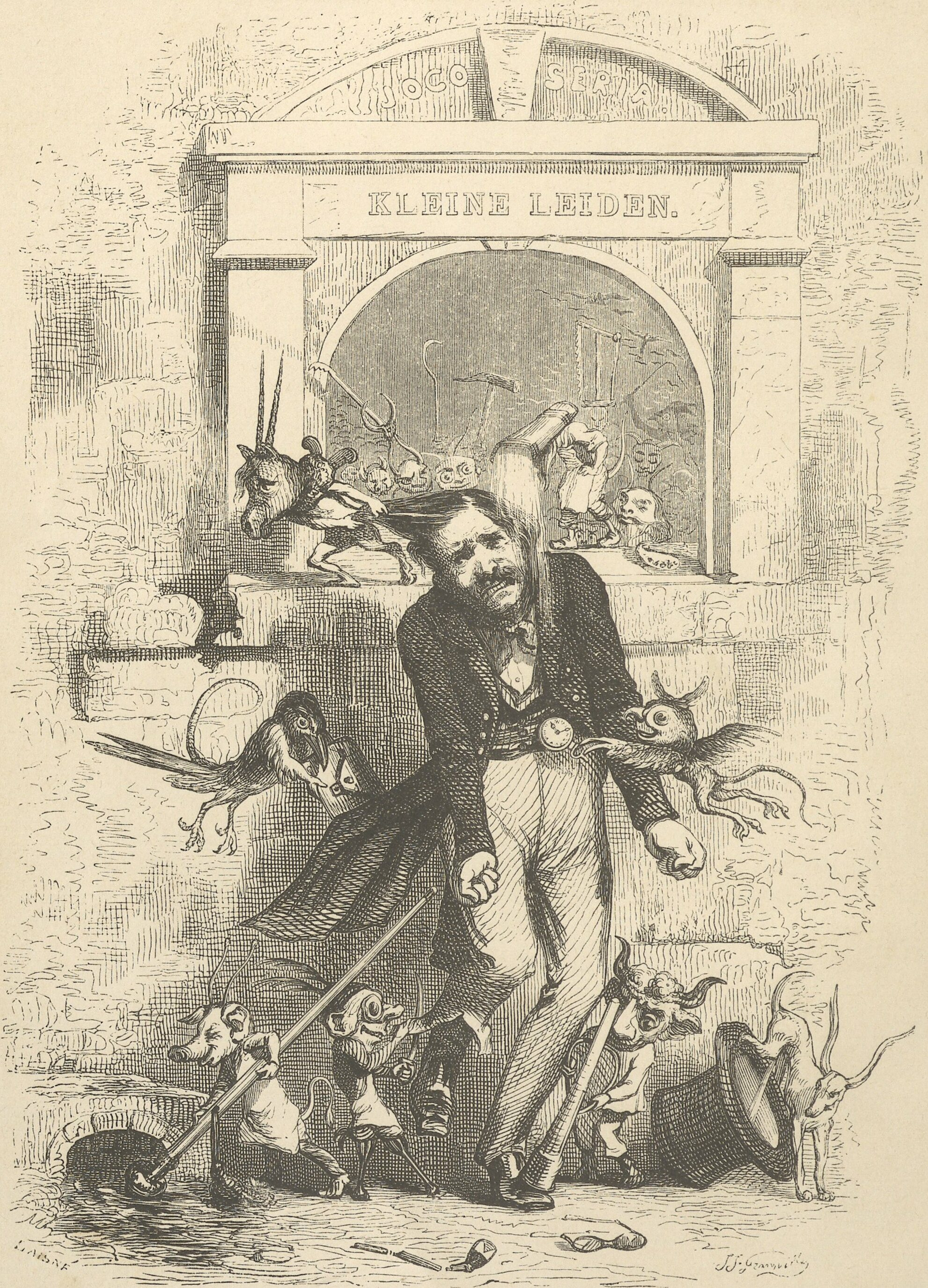
Frontispiece: from Petites misères de la vie humaine (1843)

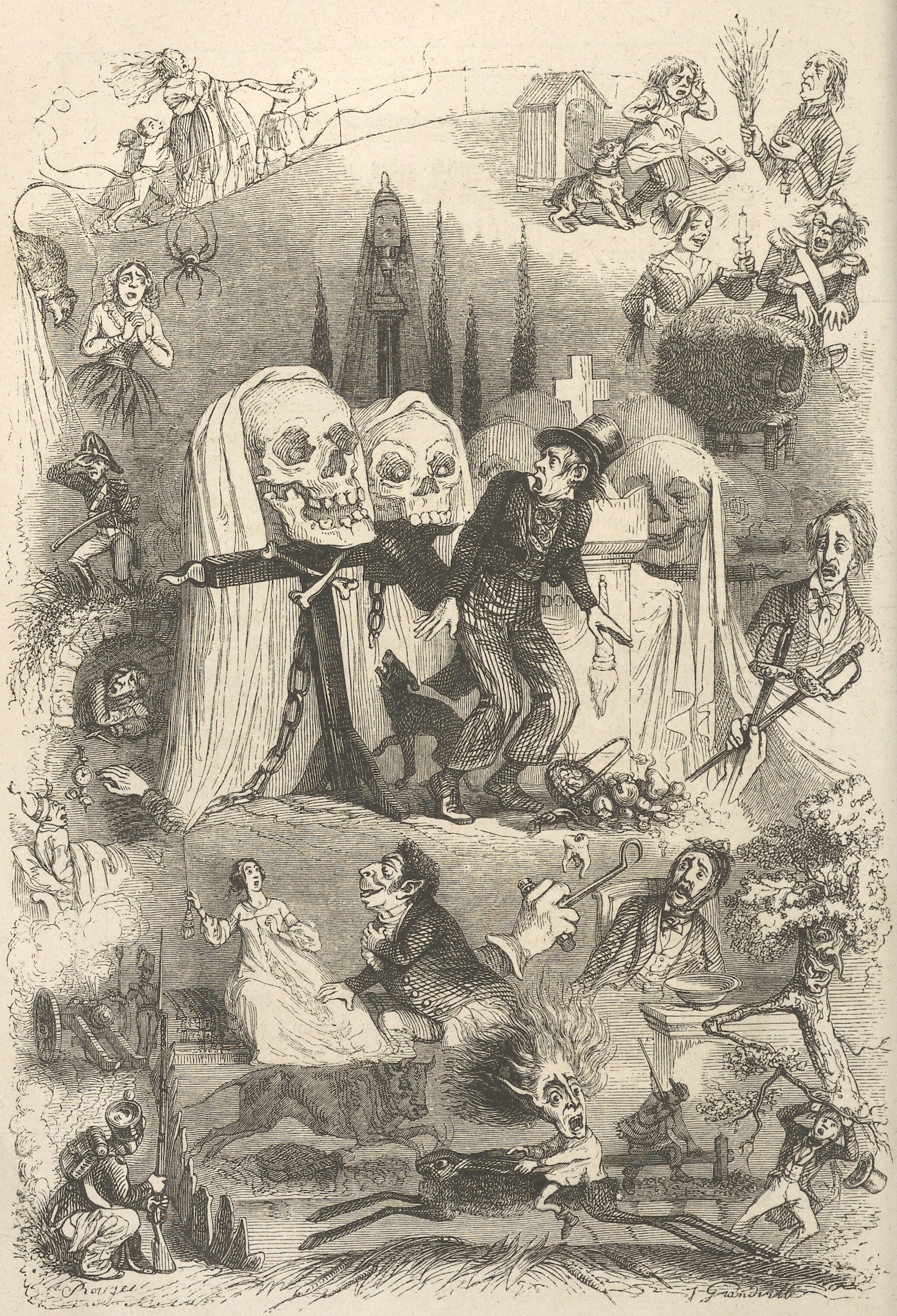
Gallery of Horrors: from Petites misères de la vie humaine

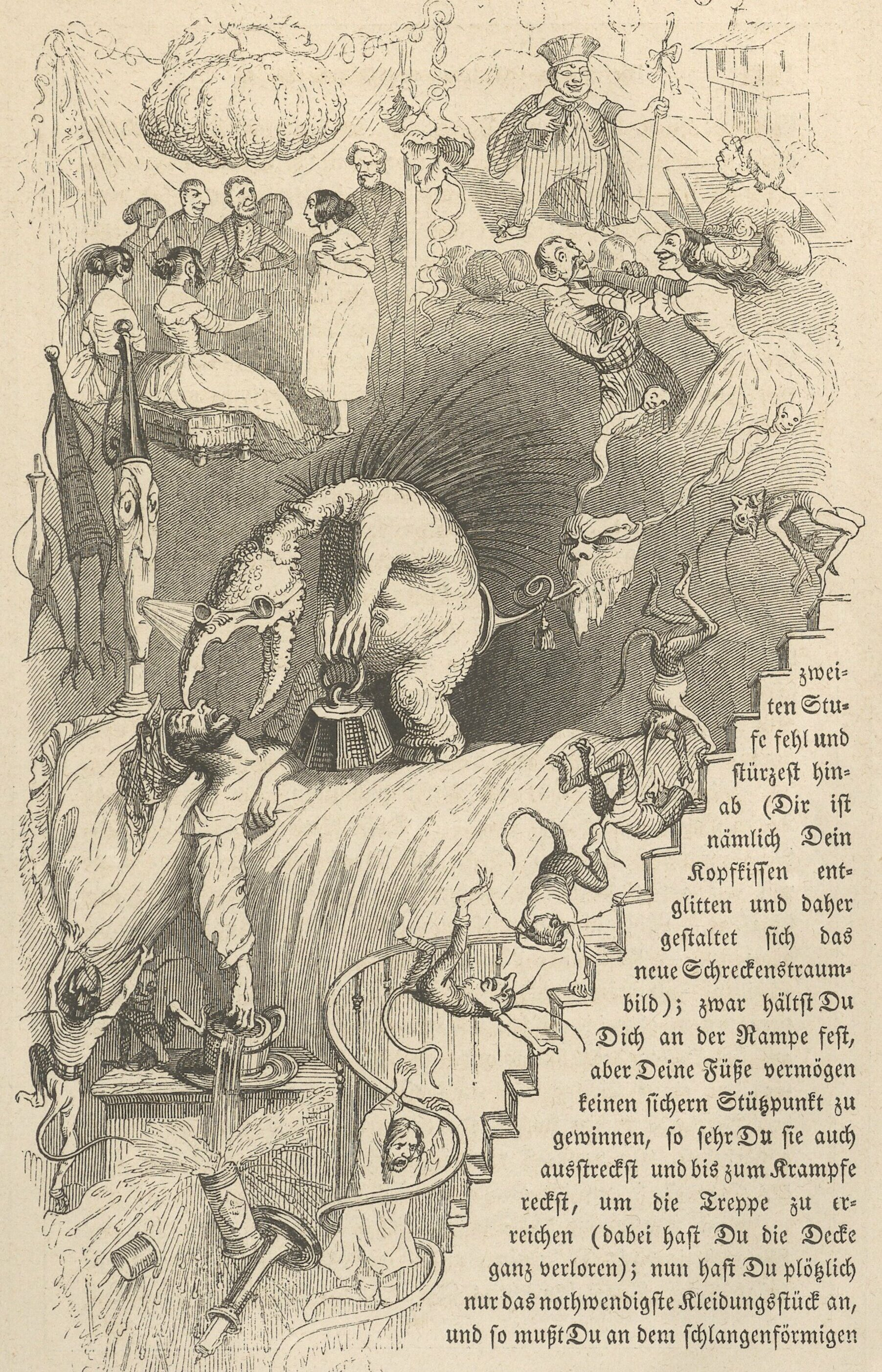
The Nightmare: from Petites misères de la vie humaine

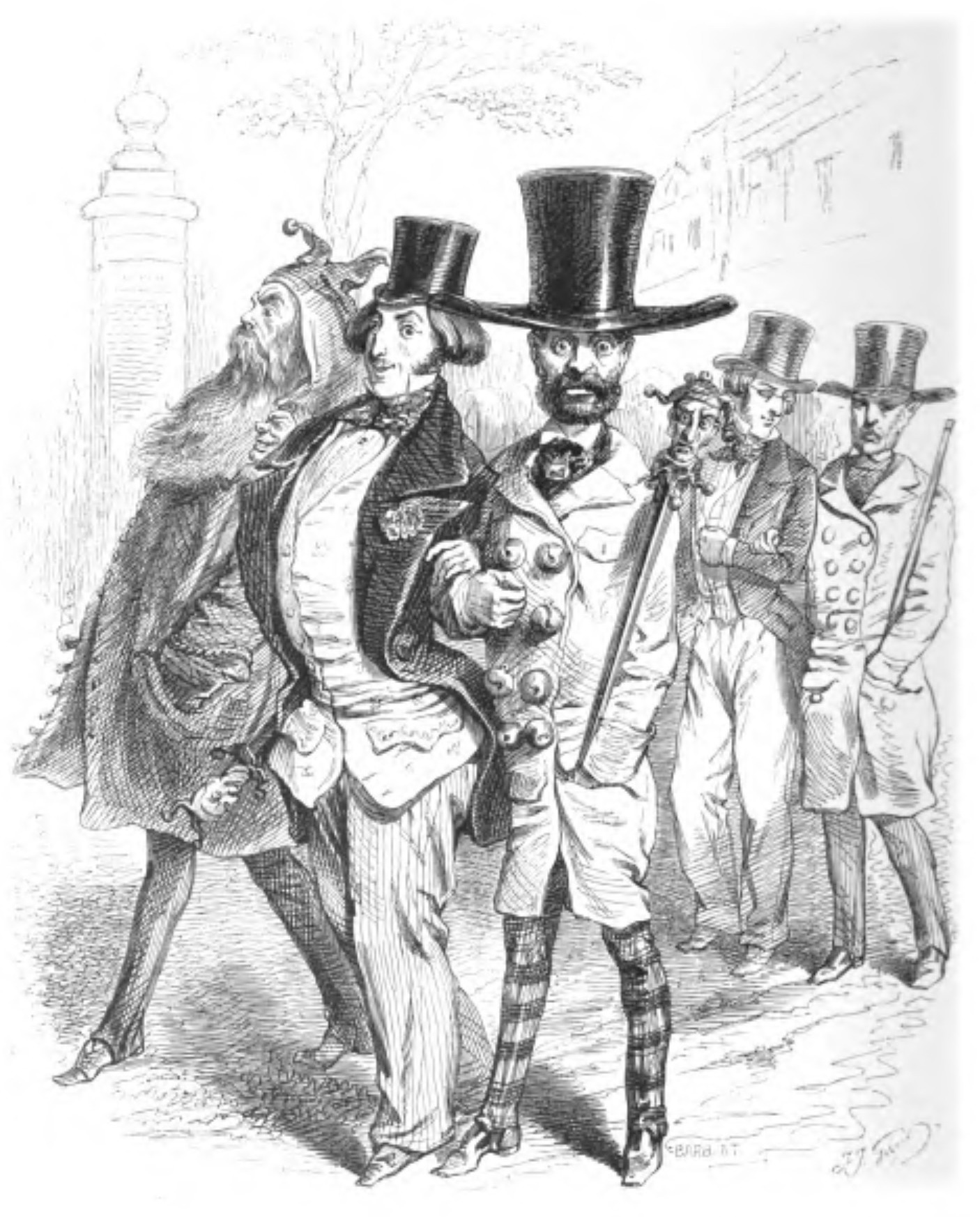
Fools invent fashions, and the wise follow: from Cent Proverbes (1845)

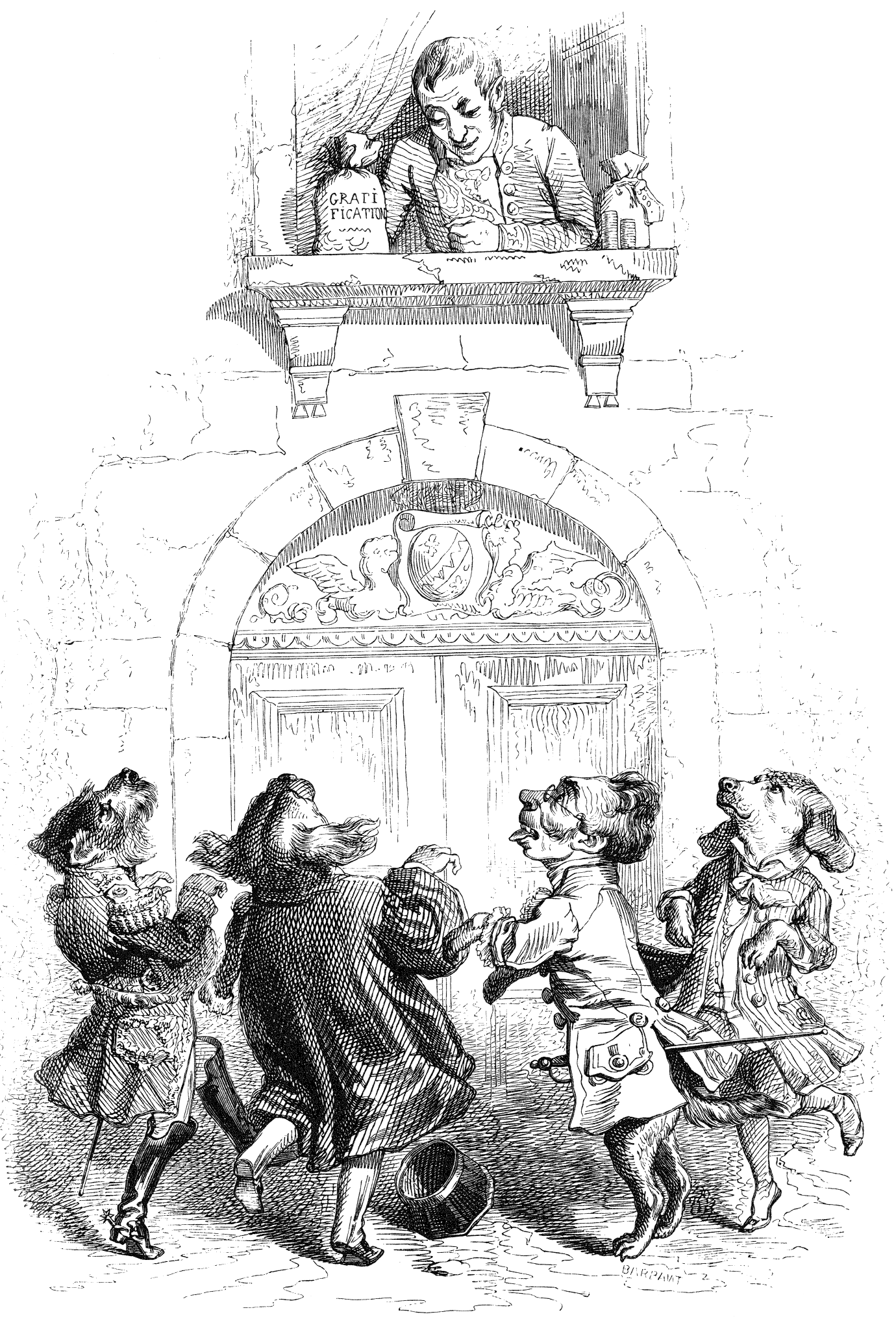
For the money the dogs dance: from Cent Proverbes

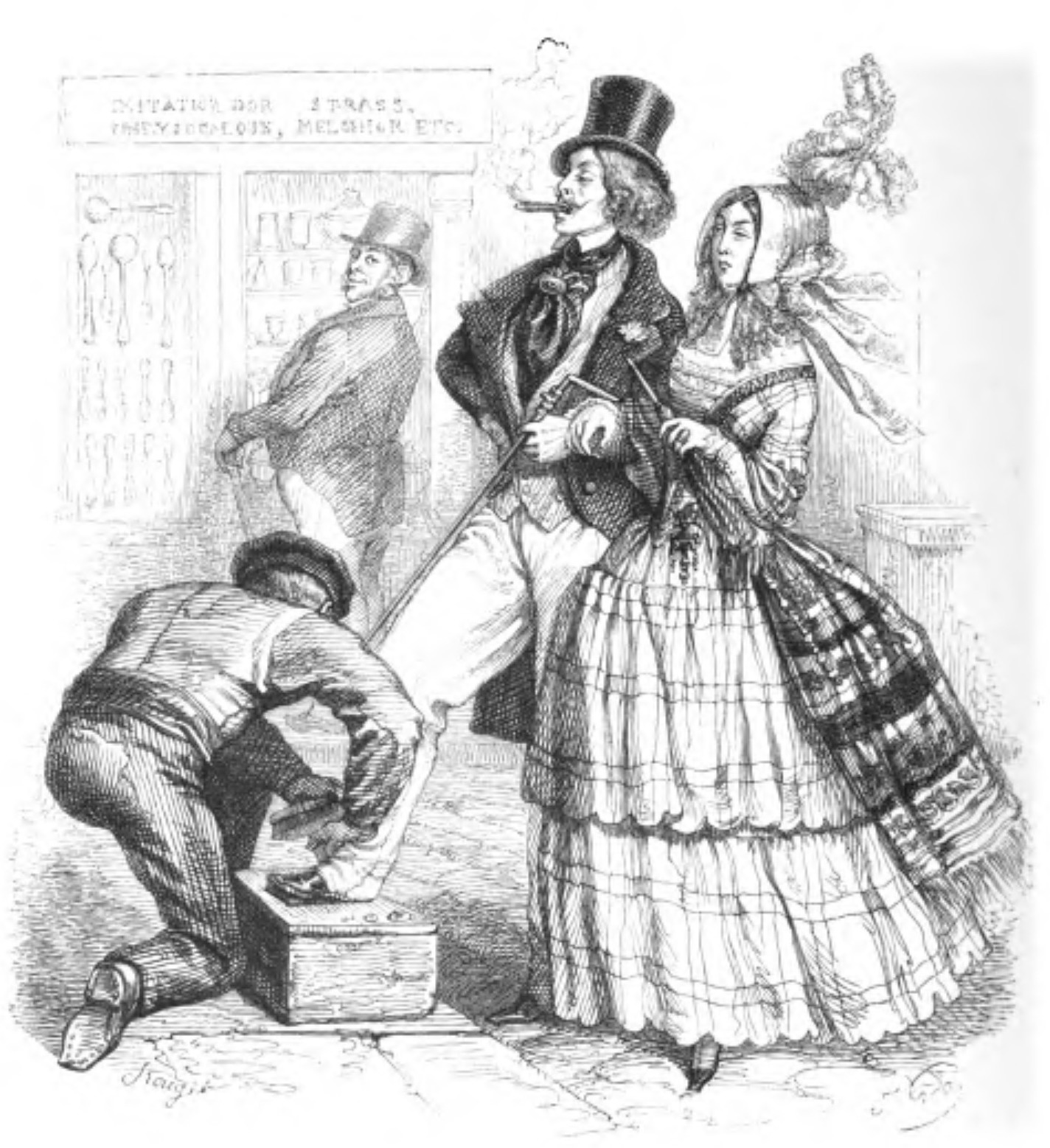
All that glitters is not gold: from Cent Proverbes

== Art ==
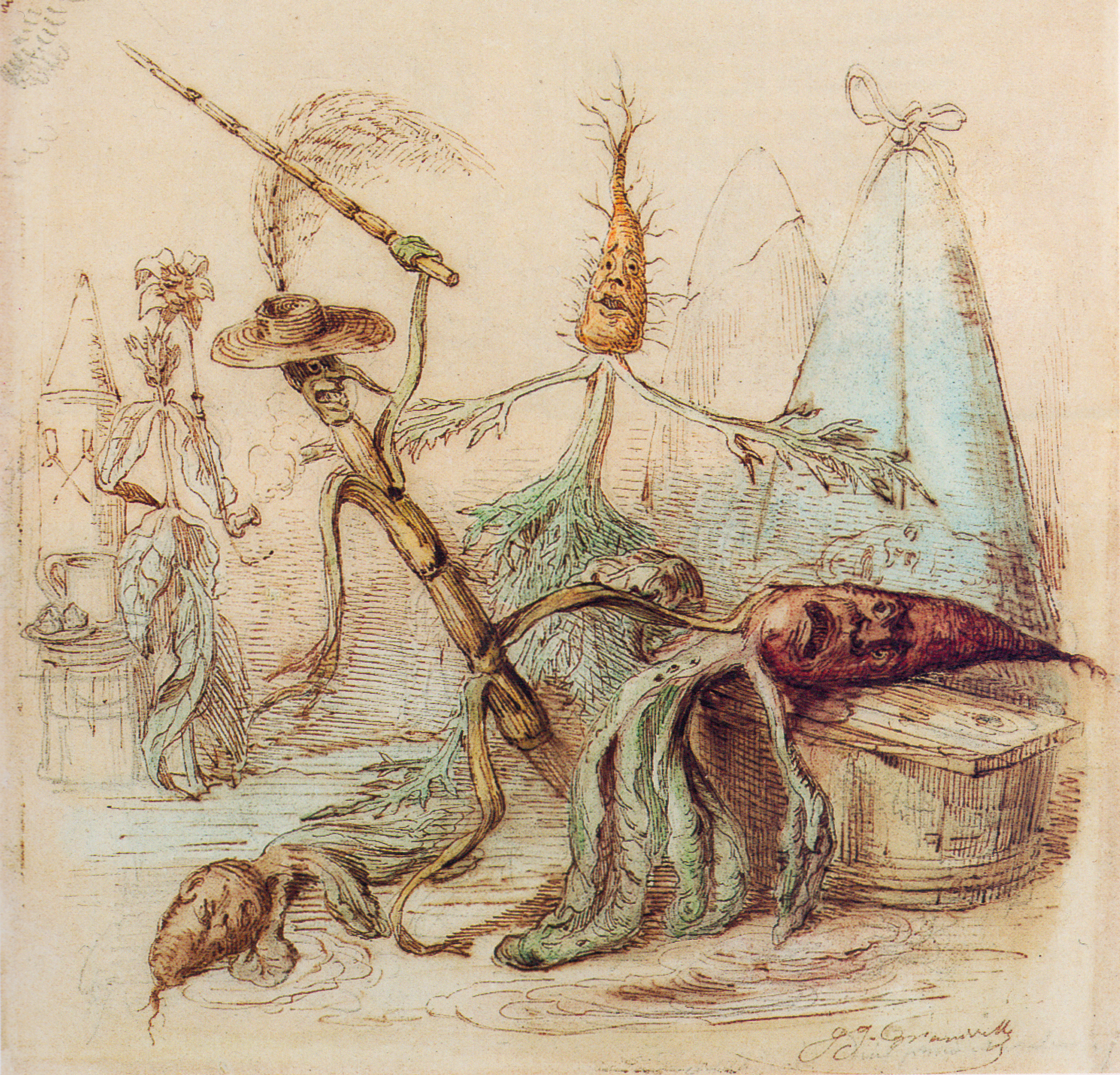
Preliminary drawing for Combat of Two Refined: for Another World (1843, watercolor, graphite, pen and ink)

Though the designs of Grandville are occasionally unnatural and absurd, they usually display keen analysis of character and marvellous inventive ingenuity, and his humour is always tempered and refined by delicacy of sentiment and a vein of sober thoughtfulness.

Grandville's ability for political provocation made his work much in demand. He worked in a wide variety of formats, from his first job illustrating the parlor game Old Maid, to illustrated newspaper strips of which he was a master. His illustrations for Le Diable à Paris ("The Devil In Paris"; 1844–1846) were used by Walter Benjamin for his study of that city as an urban organism. One of Grandville's supreme achievements, at a time when French printing technology was ascendant, was Les Fleurs Animées, a series of images that are both poetic and satirical.

Perhaps his most original contribution to the illustrated book form was Un Autre Monde, which approaches the status of pure surrealism, despite being conceived in a pre-Freudian age. The full title of the book is, Un autre monde: Transformations, visions, incarnations, ascensions, locomotions, explorations, pérégrinations, excursions, stations, cosmogonies, fantasmagories, rêveries, folâtreries, facéties, lubies, métamorphoses, zoomorphoses, lithomorphoses, métempsycoses, apothéoses et autres choses (Another world: Transformations, visions, incarnations, ascents, locomotions, explorations, peregrinations, excursions, stations, cosmogonies, phantasmagoria, reveries, frolics, pranks, fads, metamorphoses, zoomorphoses, lithomorphoses, metempsychoses, apotheoses and other things).

Original drawings

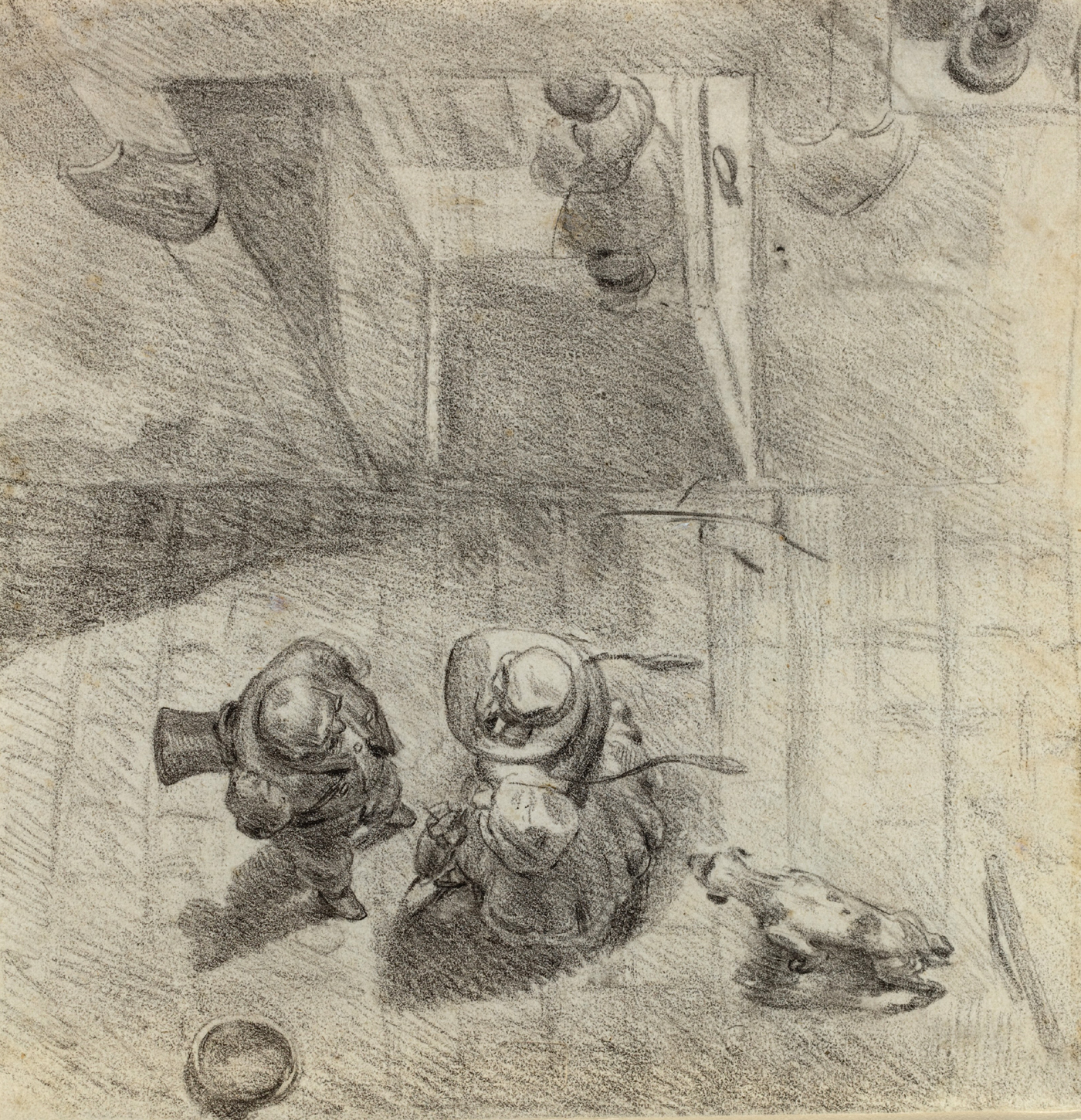
Bird's Eye View of a Man and Woman Conversing (c. 1830), graphite, 18.3 x 17.8 cm., National Gallery of Art

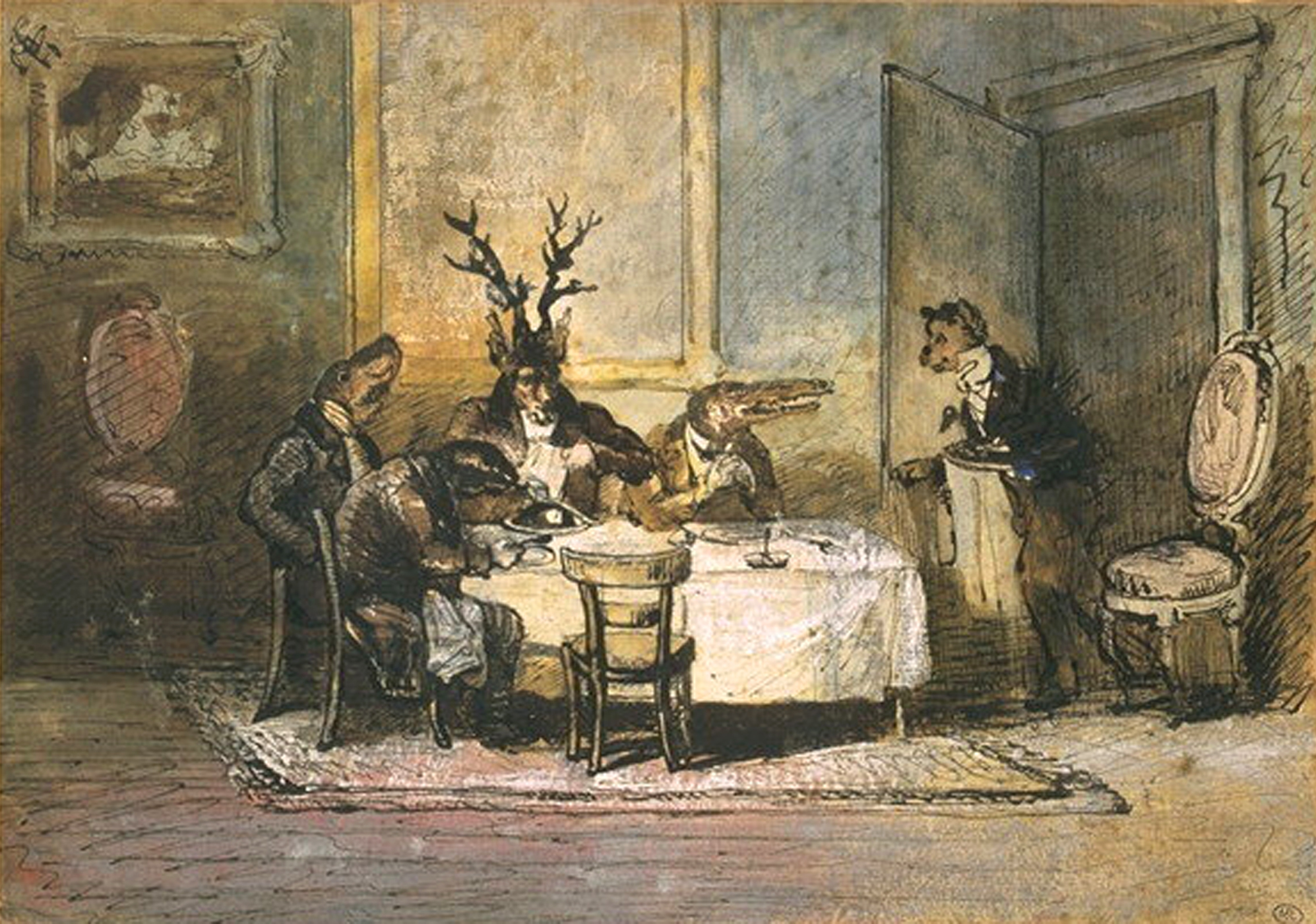
Le cabinet particulier (The Private Office) undated, pen and ink, watercolor, 18.2 x 25.6 cm, Louvre

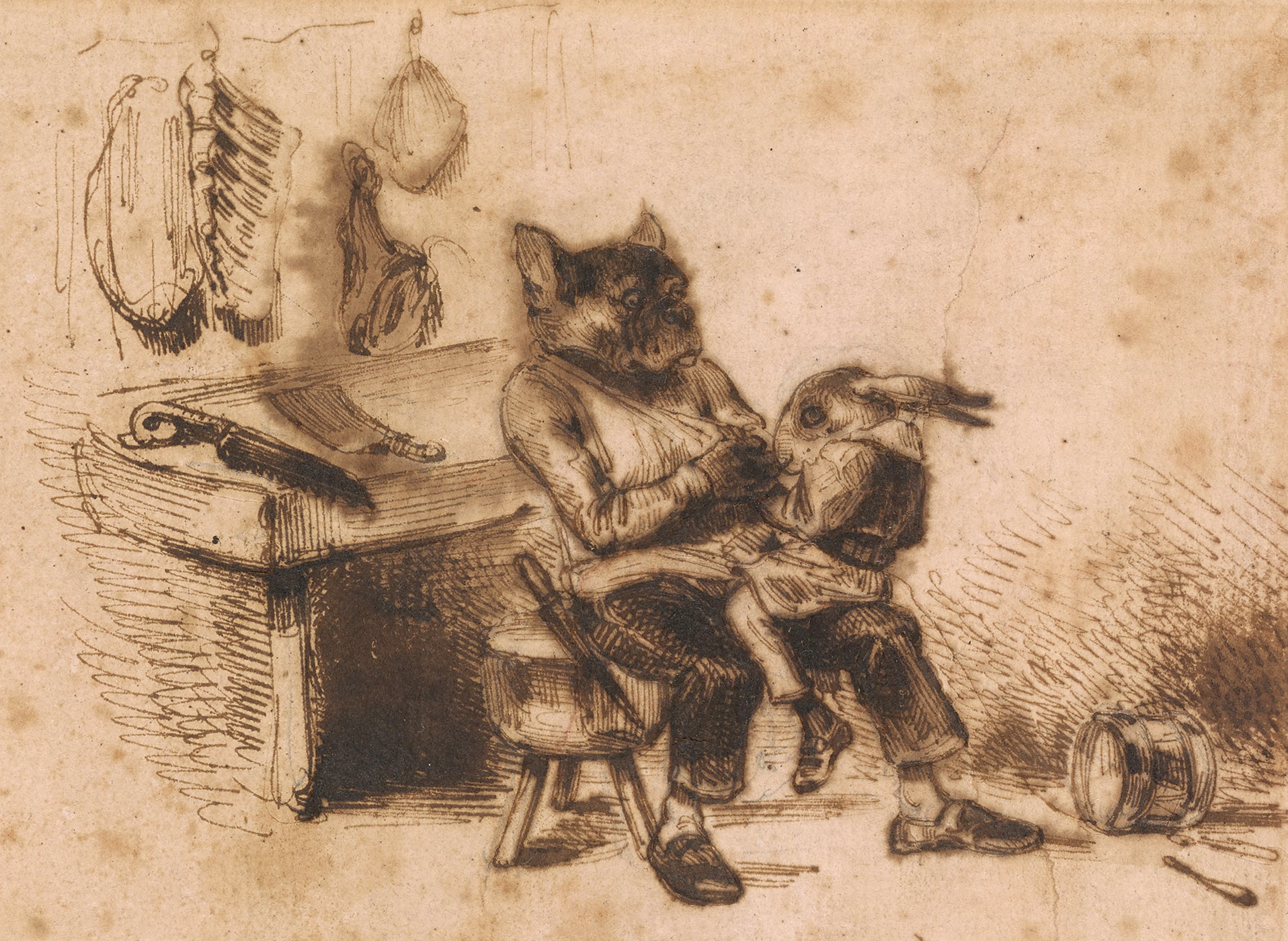
A Bulldog Butcher with a Rabbit on his Knee (undated), pen & ink, 9.9 x 11.7 cm., Morgan Library & Museum

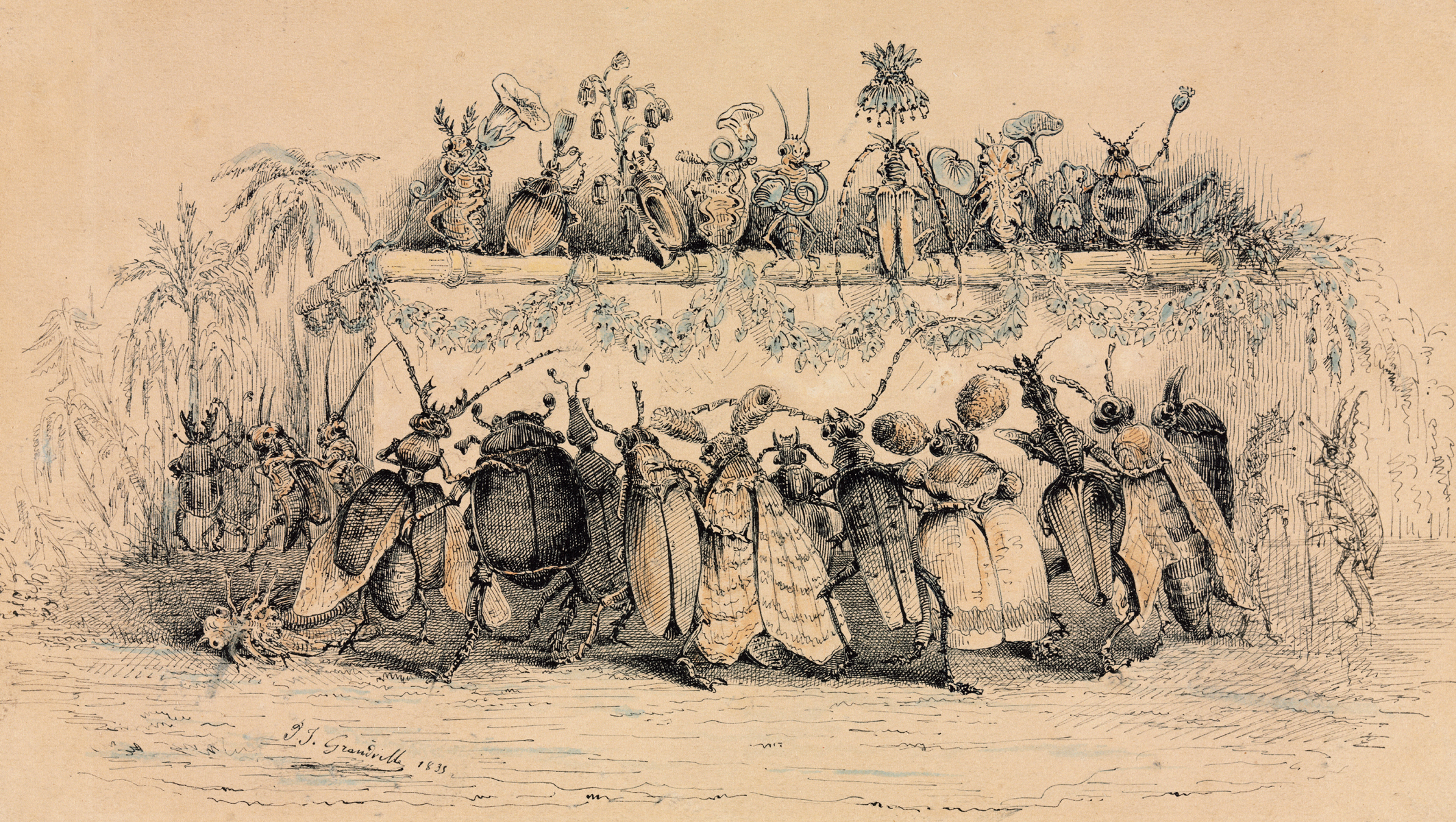
An Insect Ball (1835), pen, ink, and watercolor, 12.5 x 21.3 cm., Cleveland Museum of Art

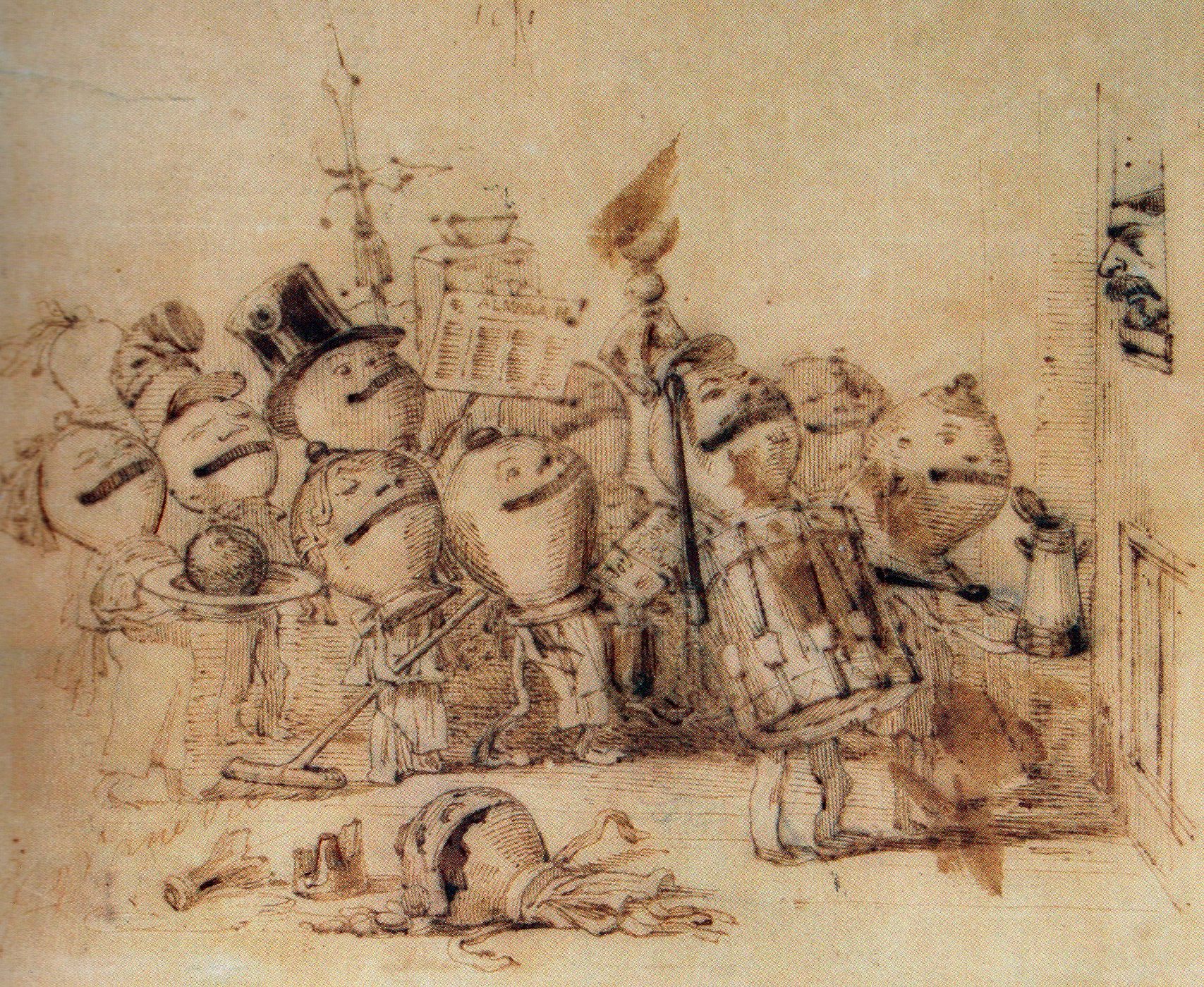
The Visiting of the Piggy Banks, from Another World (1843), pen, ink and wash, Musée des Beaux-Arts de Rouen

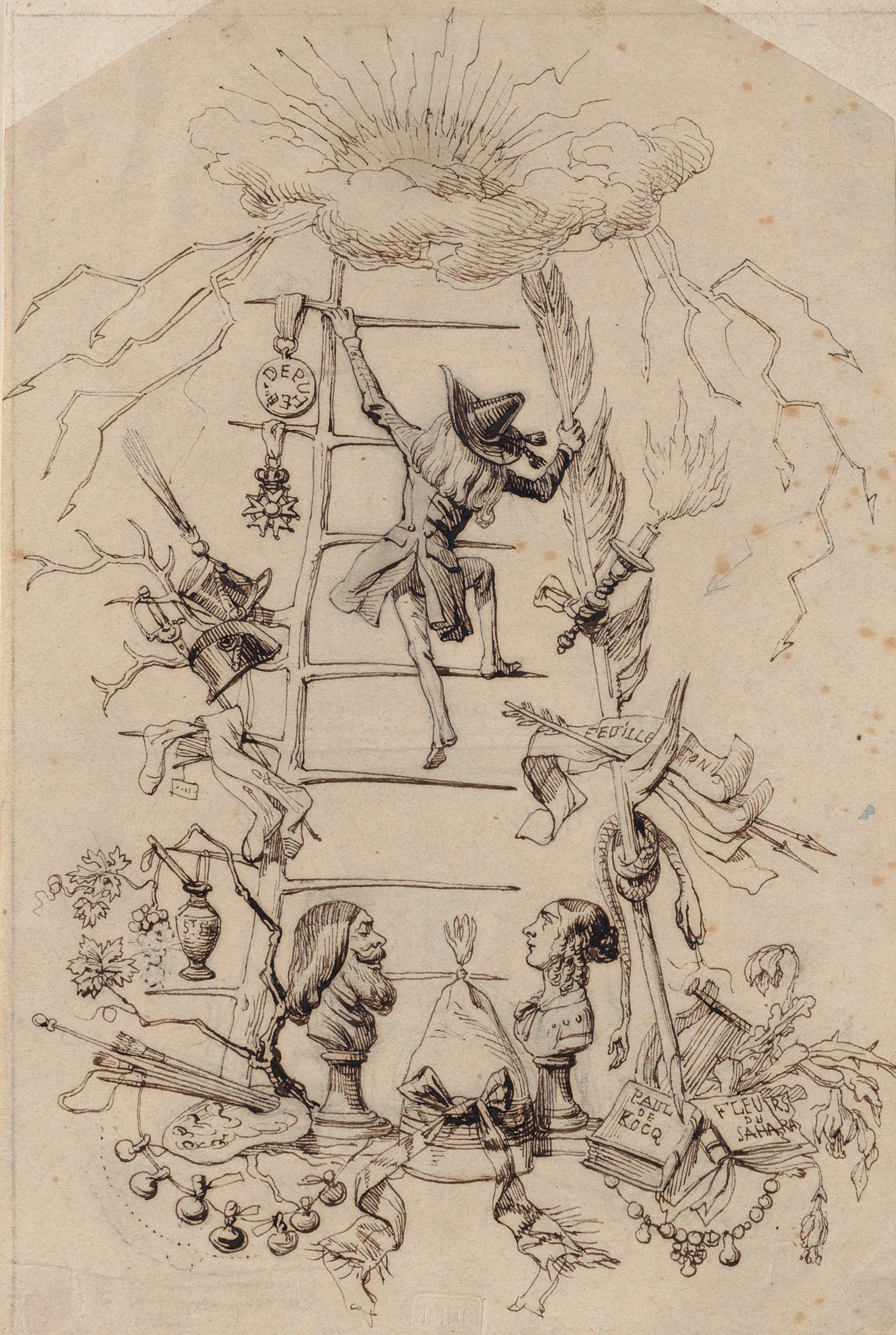
Jérôme Paturot (1846), pen and ink, 20.4 x 14 cm., Metropolitan Museum of Art

== Legacy ==
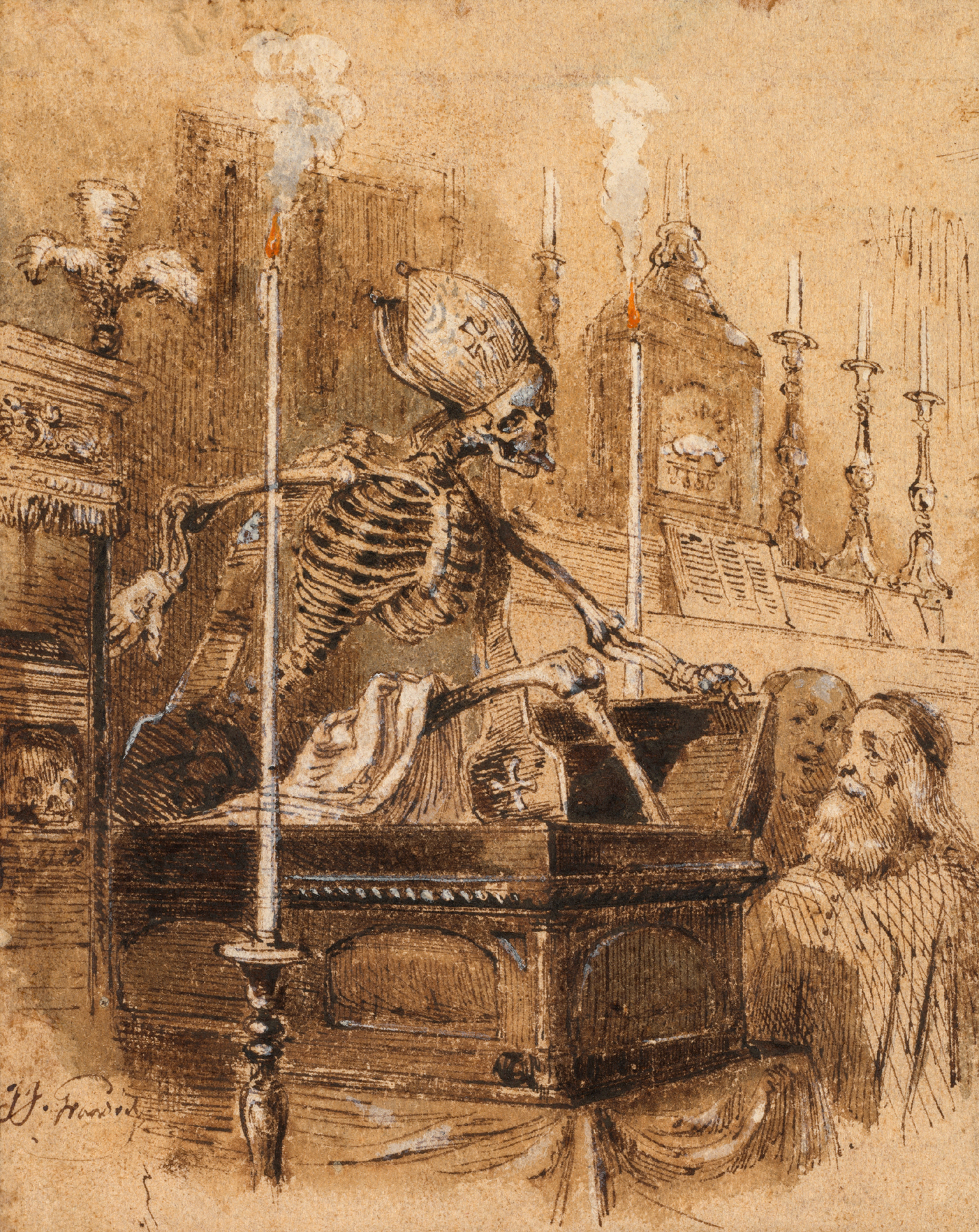
The Relics (c. 1835), pen and ink with gouache 11.8 x 9.4 cm., Cleveland Museum of Art

Alexandre Dumas wrote in his memoirs: "Grandville had a delicate and sarcastic smile, eyes that sparkled with intelligence, a satirical mouth, short figure, large heart and a delightful tincture of melancholy perceptible everywhere — that is your portrait, dear Grandville!" Interest in Grandville's art remained relatively high for a few of decades after his death. His final works were published posthumously and several of his books were reissued in later editions and translated into other languages. Rue Grandville (48.83919°N, 2.42015°E), in the Saint-Mandé commune of Paris, is named in his honor. A monument with a bust of Grandville by Ernest Bussière was erected in the Parc de la Pépinière in Nancy, France in 1893.

Théophile Gautier's Portraits contemporains includes a short chapter on Grandville. Over 25 years after Grandville's death, Gautier wrote that Grandville still enjoyed "a popular reputation and whose drawings, caricatures, and illustrations are known to everyone". Although Gautier judged Grandville less a colorist than Daumier and less a poet than Tony Johannot, he stated, "His original pen-and-ink drawings are exquisite in finesse, liveliness, and well rendered, and will gain in value year after year. We can ape Grandville, but will not equal it again."

Honoré de Balzac expressed ambivalent views of Grandville. He was an enthusiastic supporter and collector of Grandville's early print series, and the two worked together at La Caricature in the early 1830s, where Balzac worked as an editor, and caricatures were an integral part of the newspaper. However in the 1840s, when publishers begin including illustrations in books, Balzac became more critical. He believed illustrations competed with the written word, distorted and diluted the text, and were undermining the market for novels, perhaps with some justification. Balzac contributed chapters to Grandville's Scènes de la vie privée et publique des animaux (1842) which was one of the bestsellers of the 1840s, selling 25,000 copies, while Balzac's first edition novels of the period were only selling 1,200–3,000 copies.

Charles Baudelaire, friend and champion of Honoré Daumier, was not a fan of Grandville. It seems odd that the author of Les Fleurs du mal (The Flowers of Evil), with poems such as Spleen, and the great admirer and translator of Edgar Allan Poe, felt frightened by the images of Grandville. Today his criticisms read like an underhanded compliment.

There are superficial people whom Grandville amuses, but as for me, he frightens me. When I enter into Grandville's work, I feel a certain discomfort, like in an apartment where disorder is systematically organized, where bizarre cornices rest on the floor, where paintings seem distorted by an optic lens, where objects are deformed by being shoved together at odd angles, where furniture has its feet in the air, and where drawers push in instead of pulling out. Charles Baudelaire (1857)

His style and humour had a marked influence on John Tenniel and various other Punch-cartoonists.

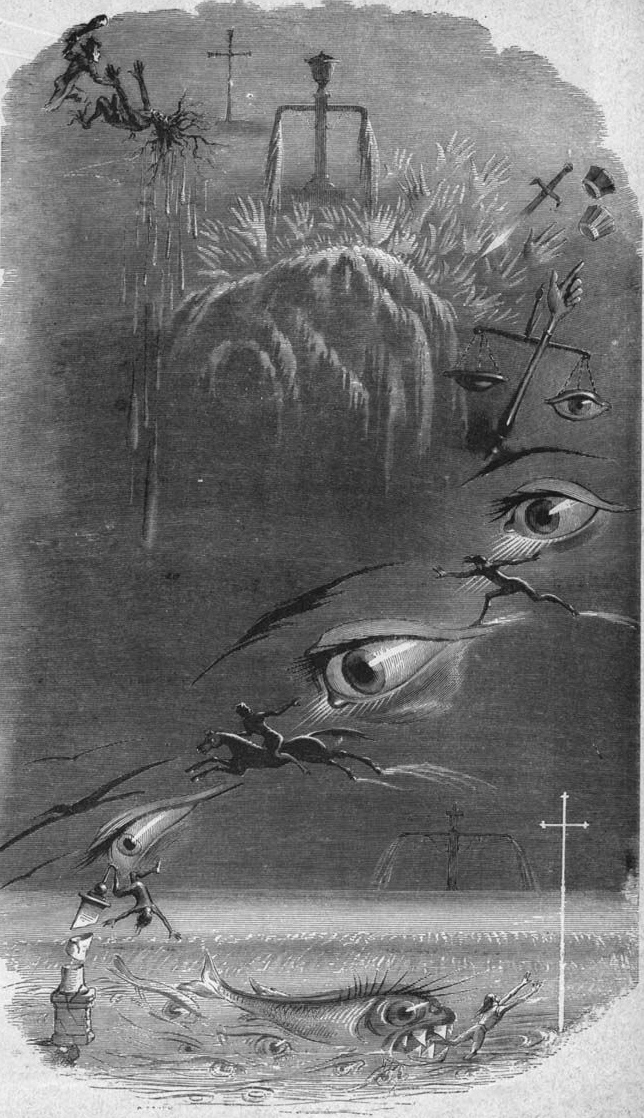
Crime and Expiation (1847), wood engraving. The original drawing was made 12 days before he died.

The art historian H. W. Janson noted Grandville's imagery anticipated various aspects of dada, surrealism, and pop art. Janson speculated if Marcel Duchamp's Tu m' (1918) could have been inspired by Grandville's View of the Paris Salon, from Un autre monde, both of which involve subjects from the two dimensional surface of a painting emerging from the canvas into the real three dimensional space of the viewer. Janson asserted that Grandville's illustration The Finger of God, also from Un autre monde, must have been familiar to pop artists producing large scale sculptures such as César Baldaccini's Le pouce (The Thumb) in 1966. Grandville's affinity with surrealism has been recognized since the 1930s. His work was included in the Museum of Modern Art's landmark exhibition Fantastic Art, Dada, and Sureealism in 1936. However, the art historian William Rubin pointed out the absence of any reference or recognition of Grandville by André Breton in his two manifestos of surrealism, or the other surrealists in the formative years of the movement in the 1920s. After a period of relative obscurity in the early 20th century, Grandville's work became widely reproduced in the 1930s. Renewed interest in his work coincided with the rise of surrealism as a mainstream movement. It was apparently only in hindsight that André Breton, Georges Bataille, Max Ernst and others came to recognize Grandville as a significant precursor to the movement (but not an influence). Max Ernst was particularly enthusiastic about Grandville's work and included him in a montage of 40 names, titled Max Ernst's favorite poets and painters, originally published in View, 1941, alongside Bosch, Vinci, Shakespeare, Blake, Poe, Van Gogh, Chirico, and others. Ernst later made the frontispiece for a 1963 facsimile edition of Un autre monde with a caption reading "A new world is born. All praise to Grandville."

British rock band Queen used part of his artwork for their 1991 album Innuendo and alternate pieces for most of the subsequent single releases: the album's title track, "I'm Going Slightly Mad", "These Are the Days of Our Lives" and "The Show Must Go On". The video clip of Innuendo featured animated versions of the illustrations inspired by Grandville, and the single "I'm Going Slightly Mad" also featured one of this characters on the back of the sleeve and as the basis for a picture disc release.

American grunge band Alice in Chains used part of Grandville's artwork ("In a Case Attached to the Bottle was a Manuscript") on the back of their self-titled 1995 album.

The graphic novel Grandville by Bryan Talbot was greatly inspired by Grandville's illustrations.

Grandville's art is used extensively in the video game Aviary Attorney, which is set during a fictionalized version of the French Revolution of 1848.

== Gallery ==
La Fontaine 's Fables (1838–1840) wood engravings

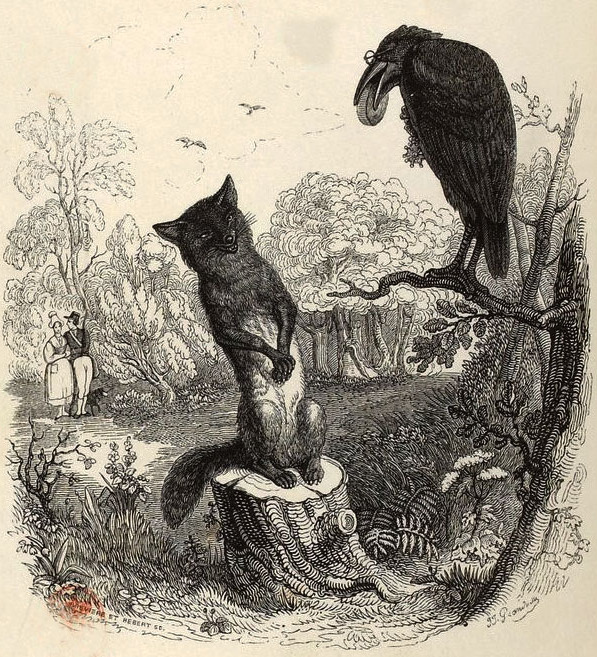
The Fox and the Crow, Vol. I, no. 2

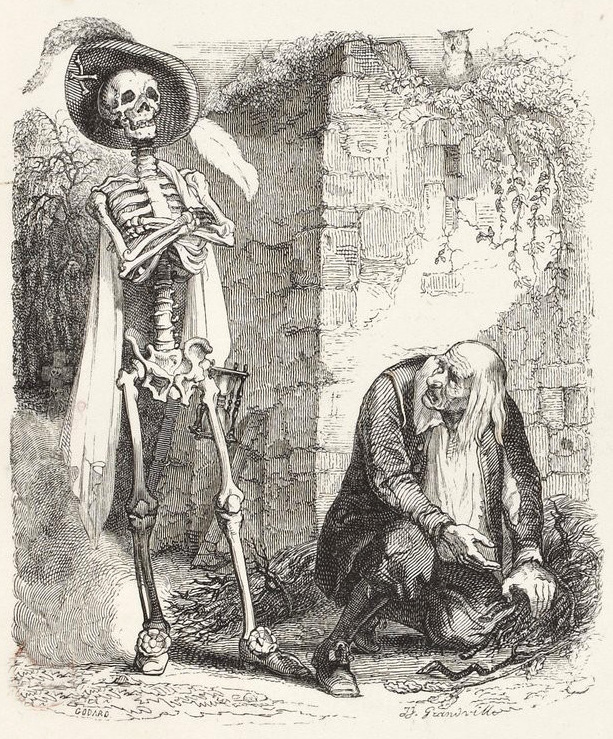
Death and the Woodcutter, Vol. I, no. 16

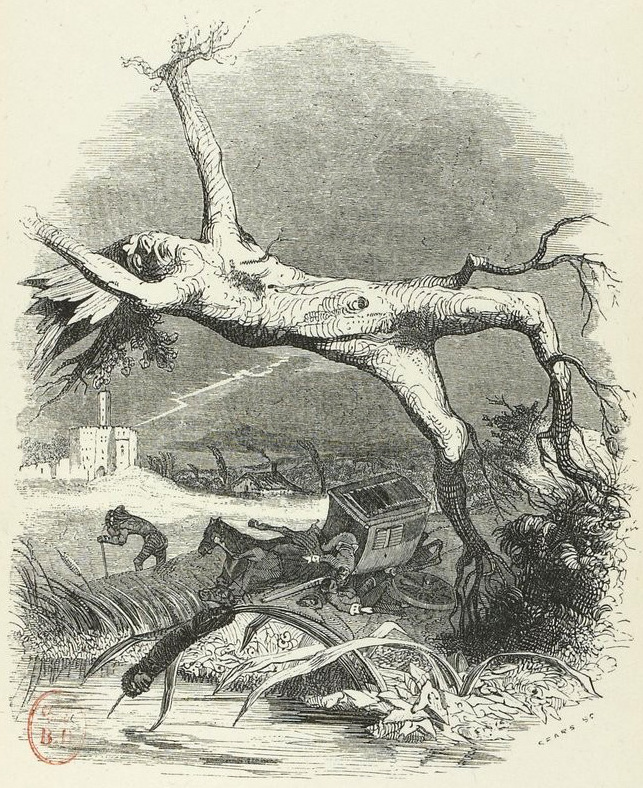
The Oak and the Reed, Vol. I, no. 22

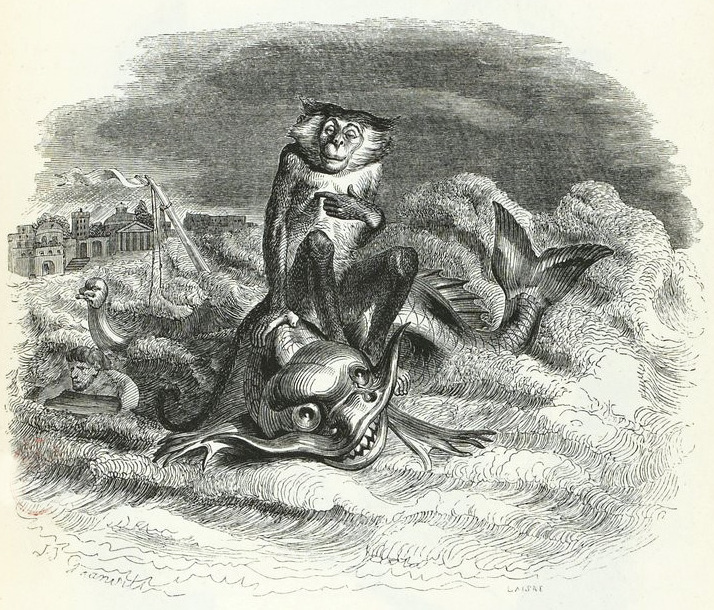
The Monkey and the Dolphin, Vol. IV, no. 7

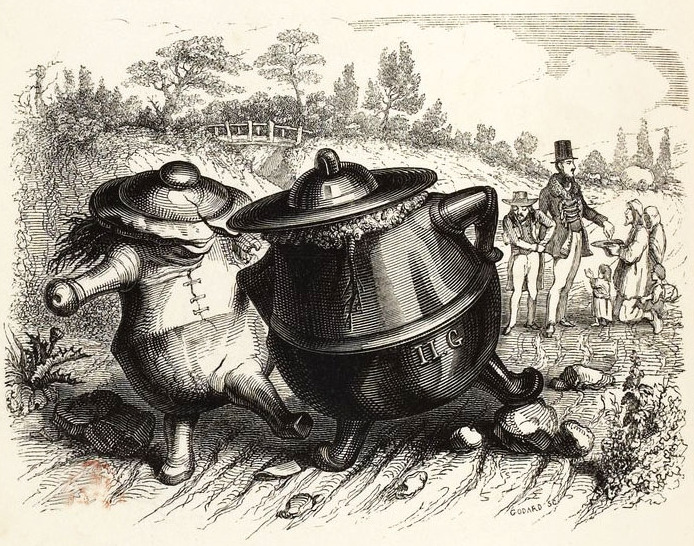
The Earthen Pot and the Iron Pot, Vol. V, no. 2

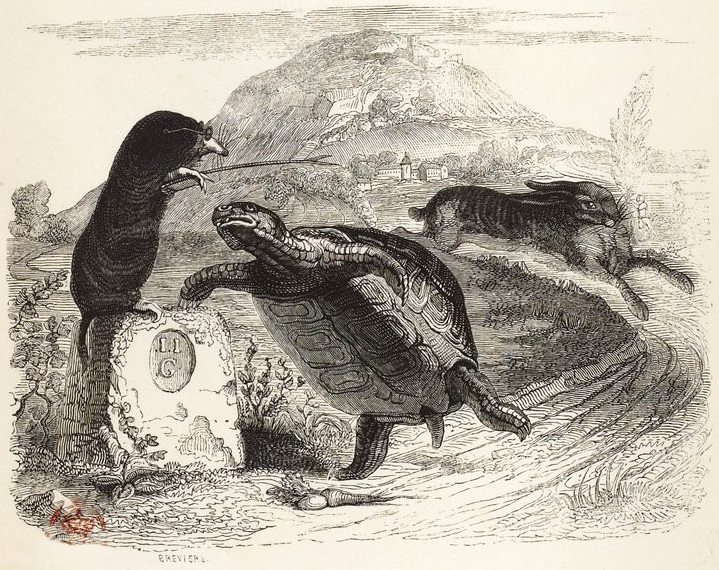
The Turtle and the Hare, Vol. VI, no. 10

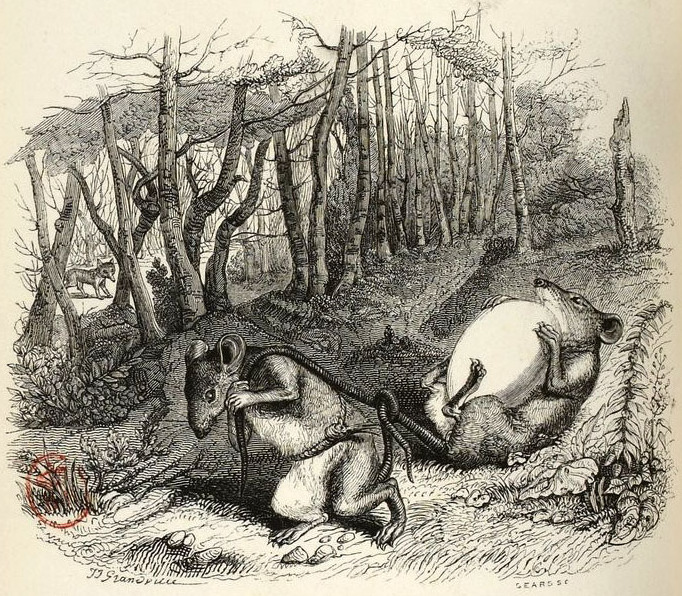
The Two Rats the Fox and the Egg, Vol. X, no. 1

Un autre monde (1843–44), preliminary drawings: graphite, pen & ink, some with watercolor

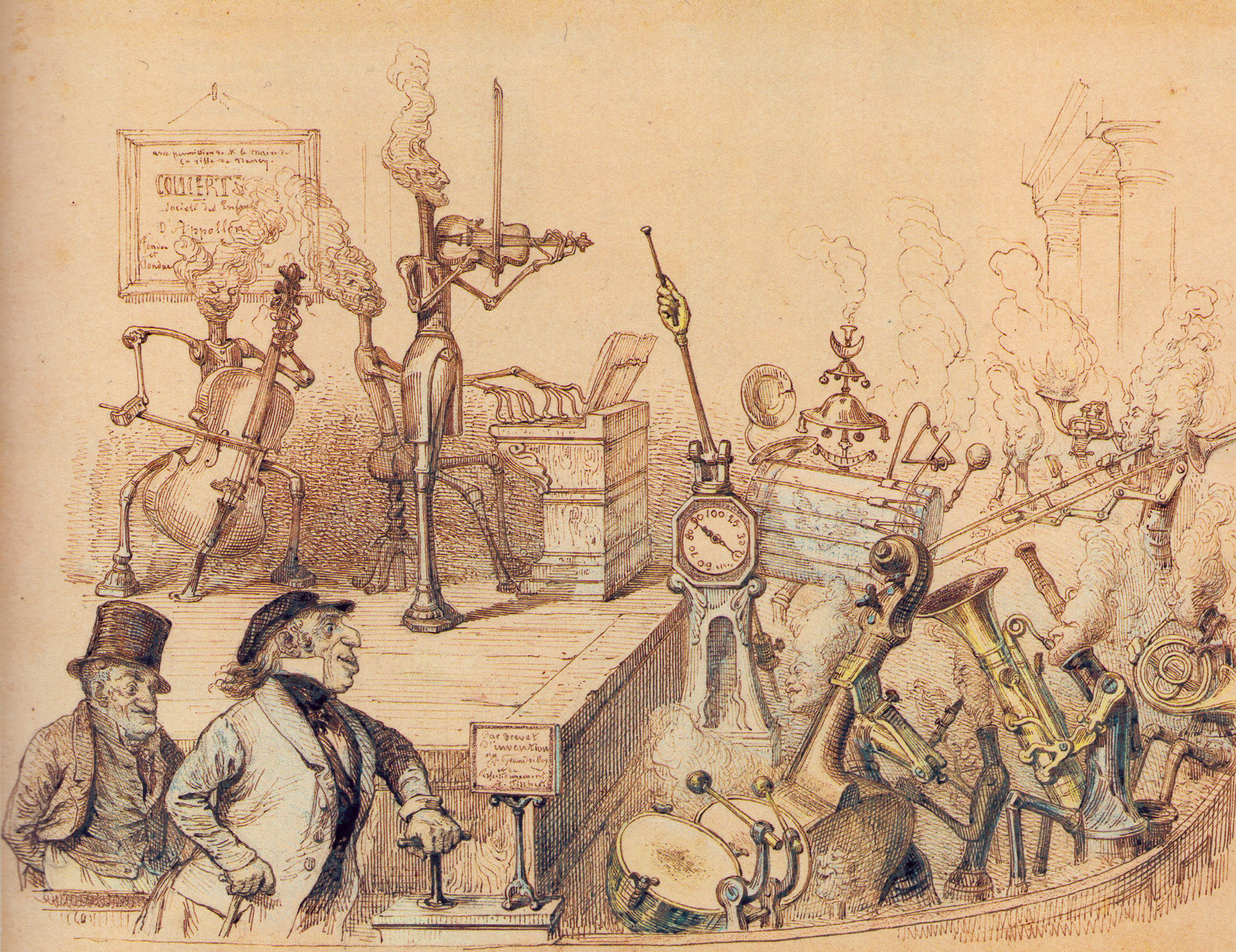
Concert a la Vapor, private collection

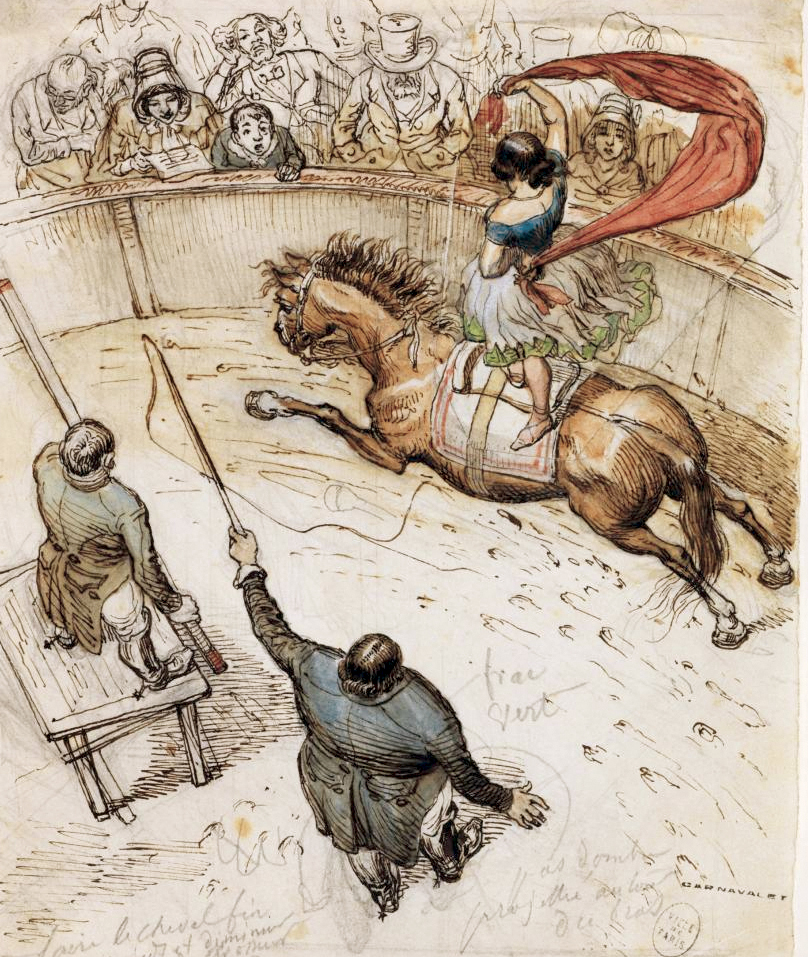
The Circus Seen from the Sky, Musée Carnavalet

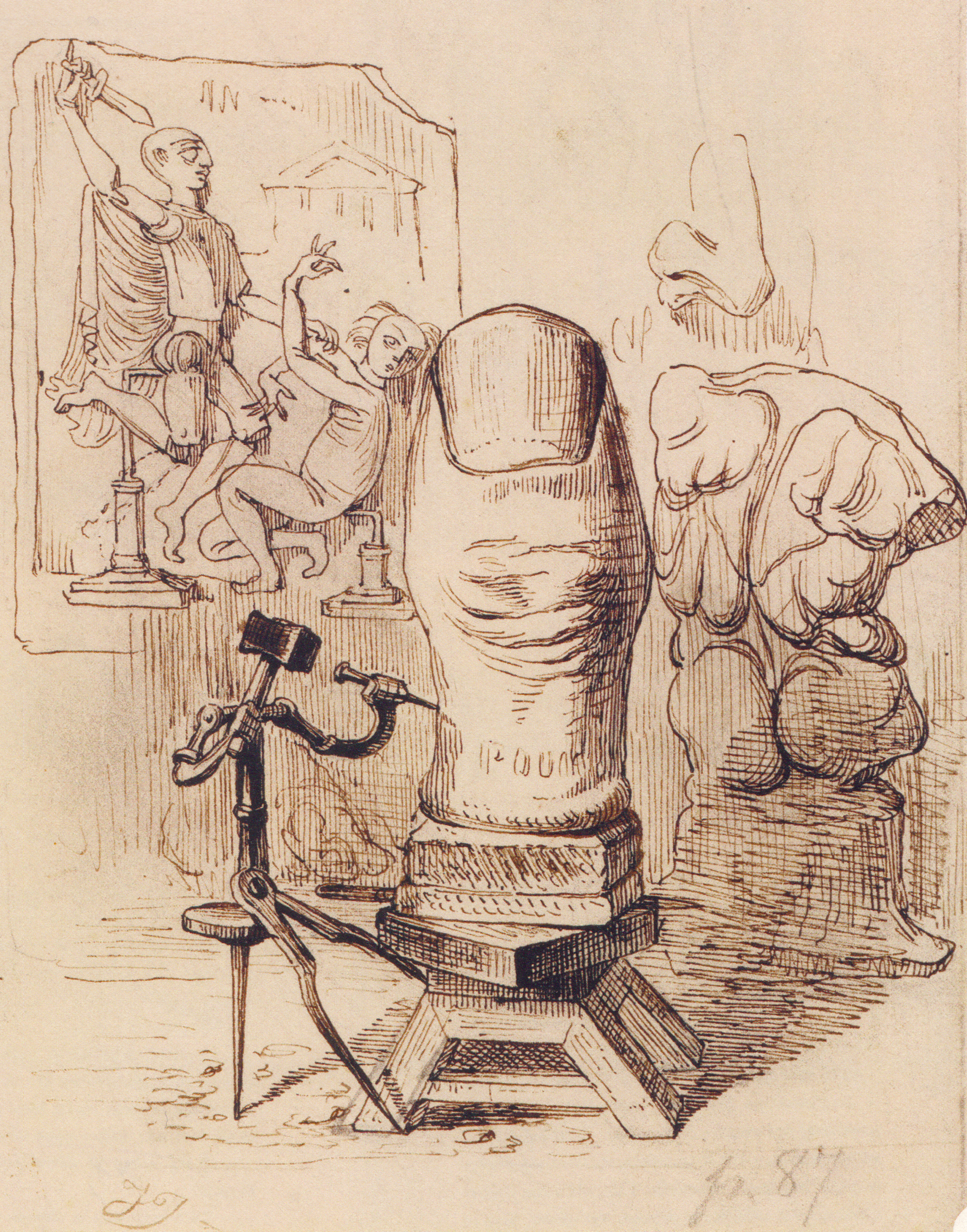
The Finger of God, private collection

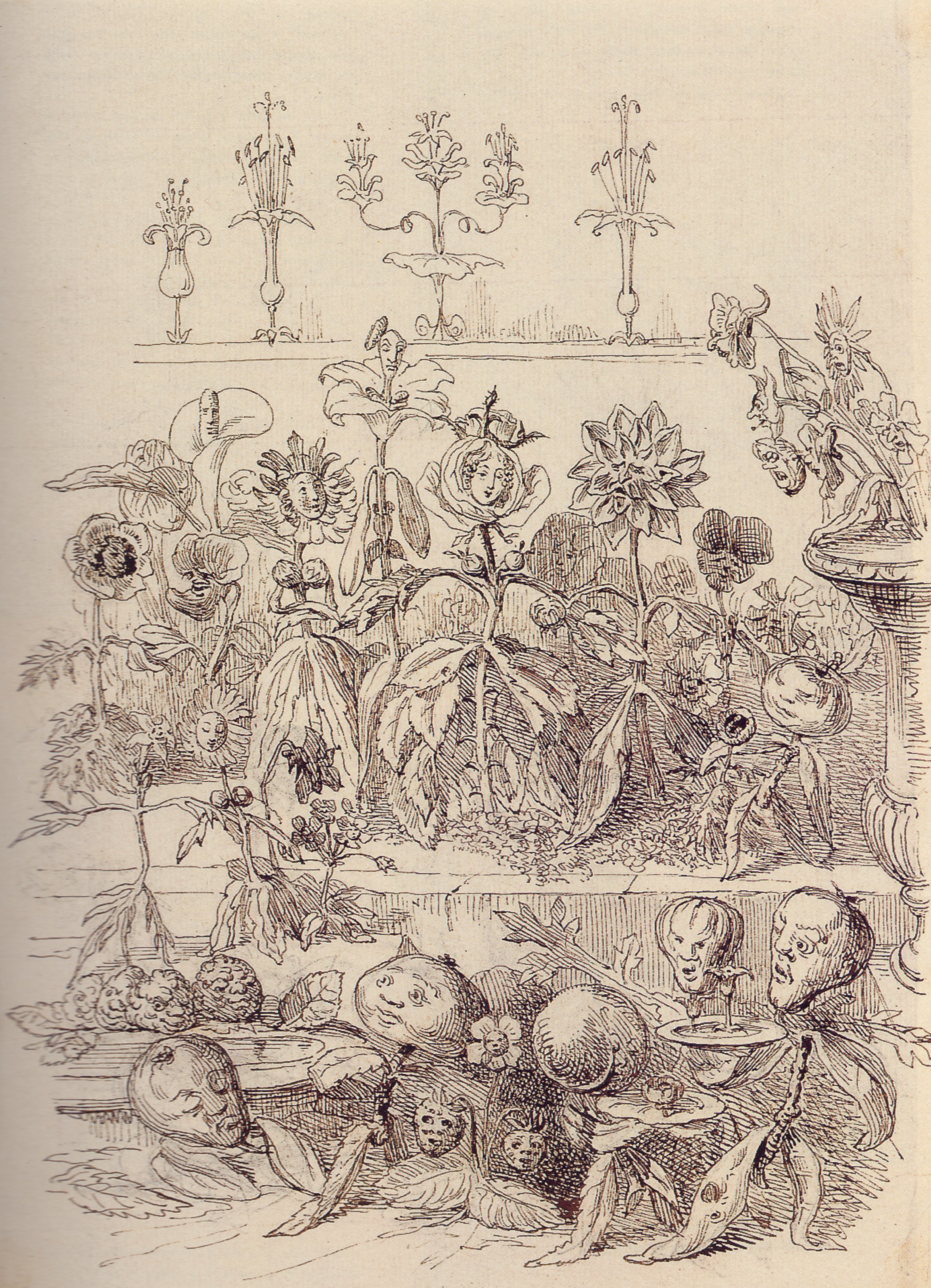
The Celebration of Flowers, private collection

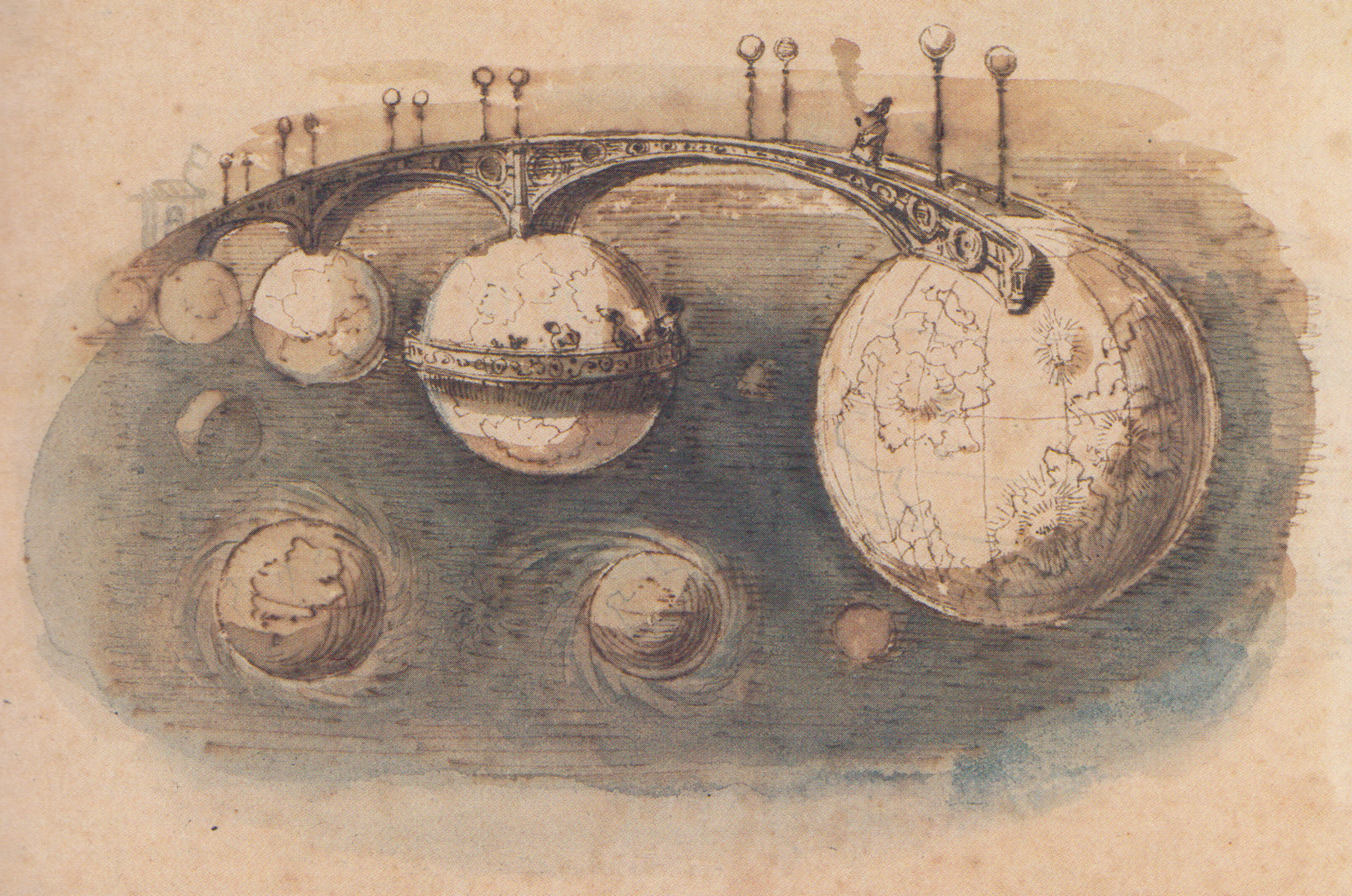
The Bridge of the Planets, private collection

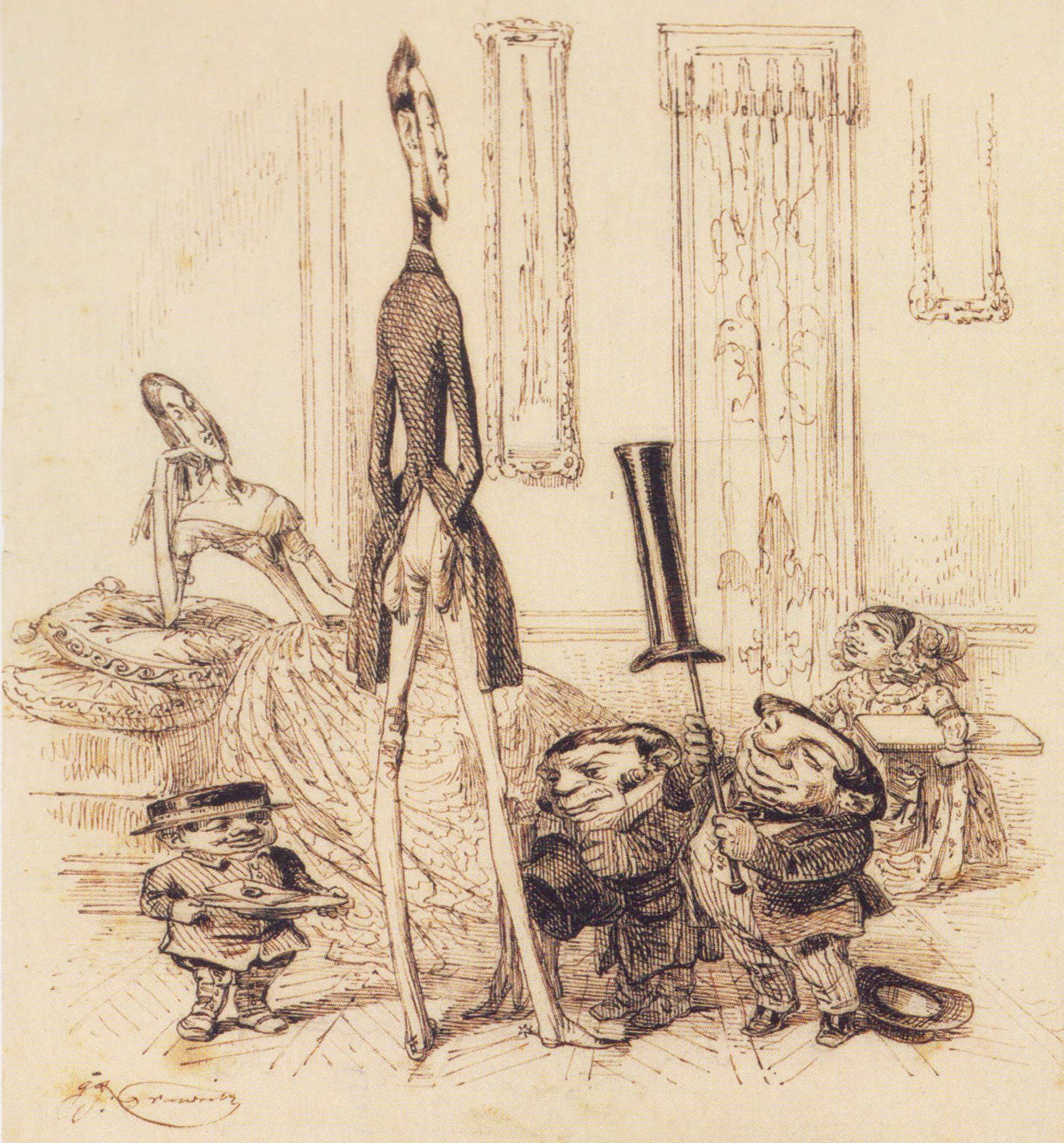
The Big and Small, private collection

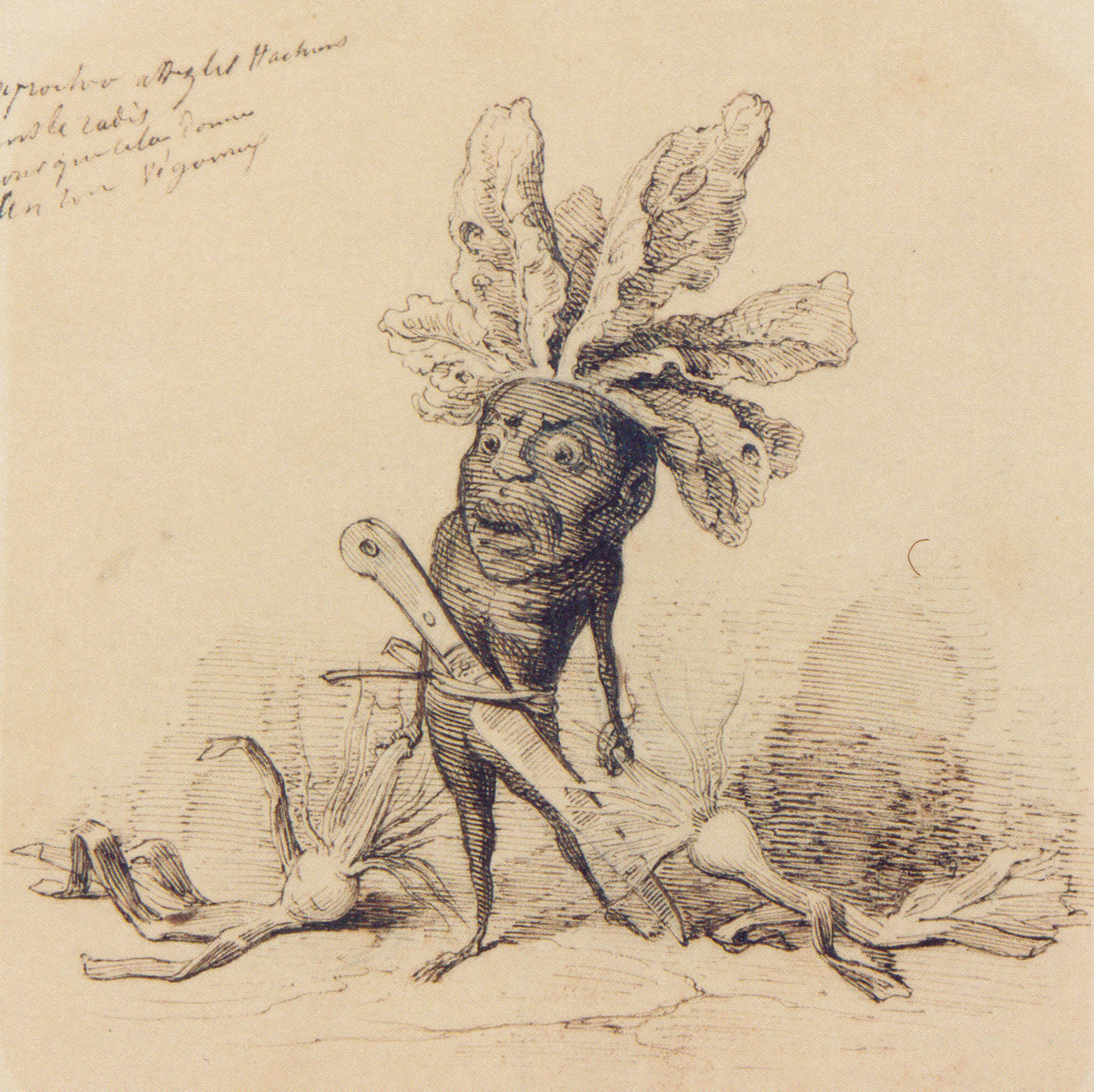
A Dramatic Radish, Bibliothèque municipale de Nancy

Un autre monde (1844), wood engravings

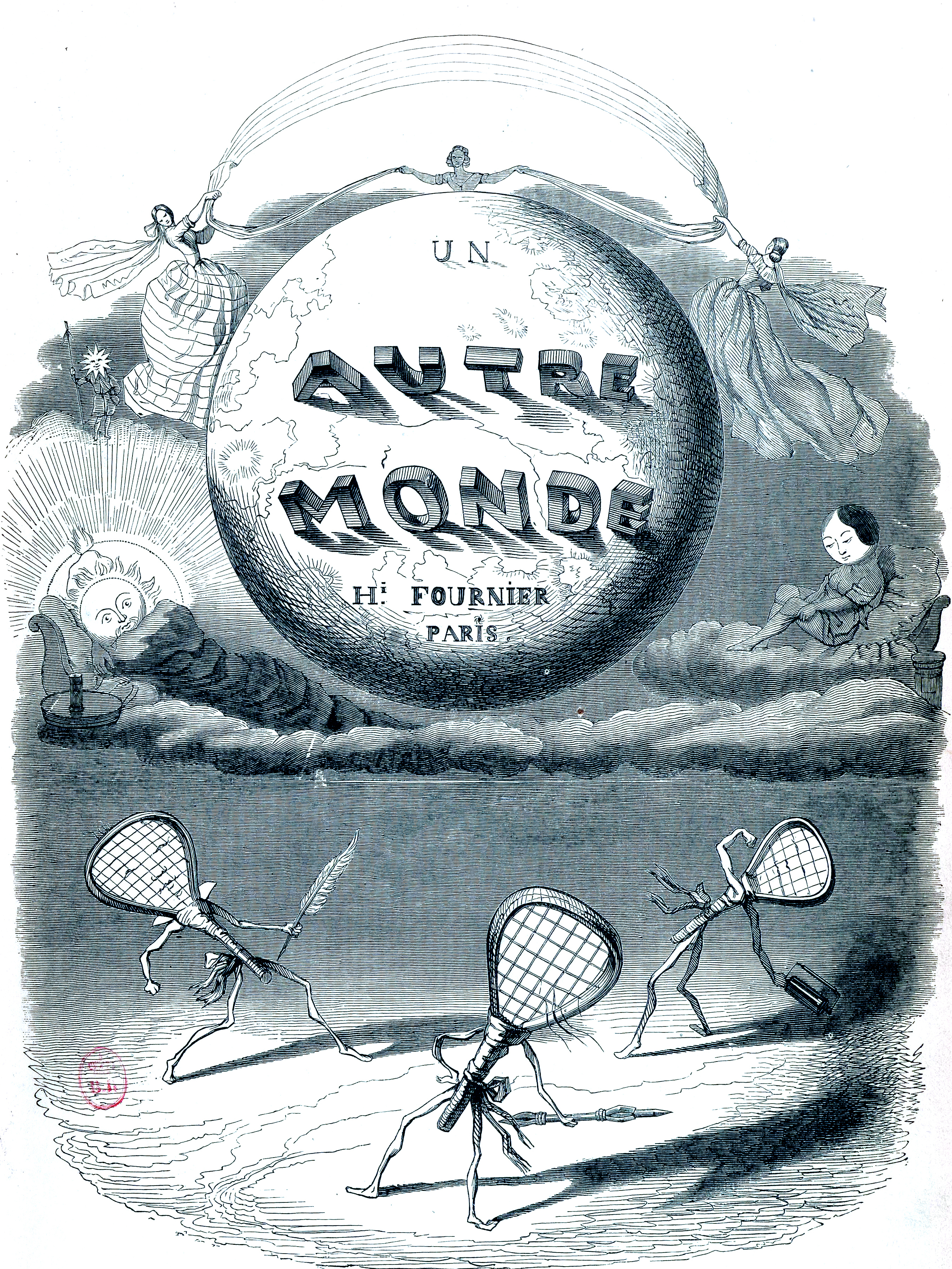
Another World, Title page

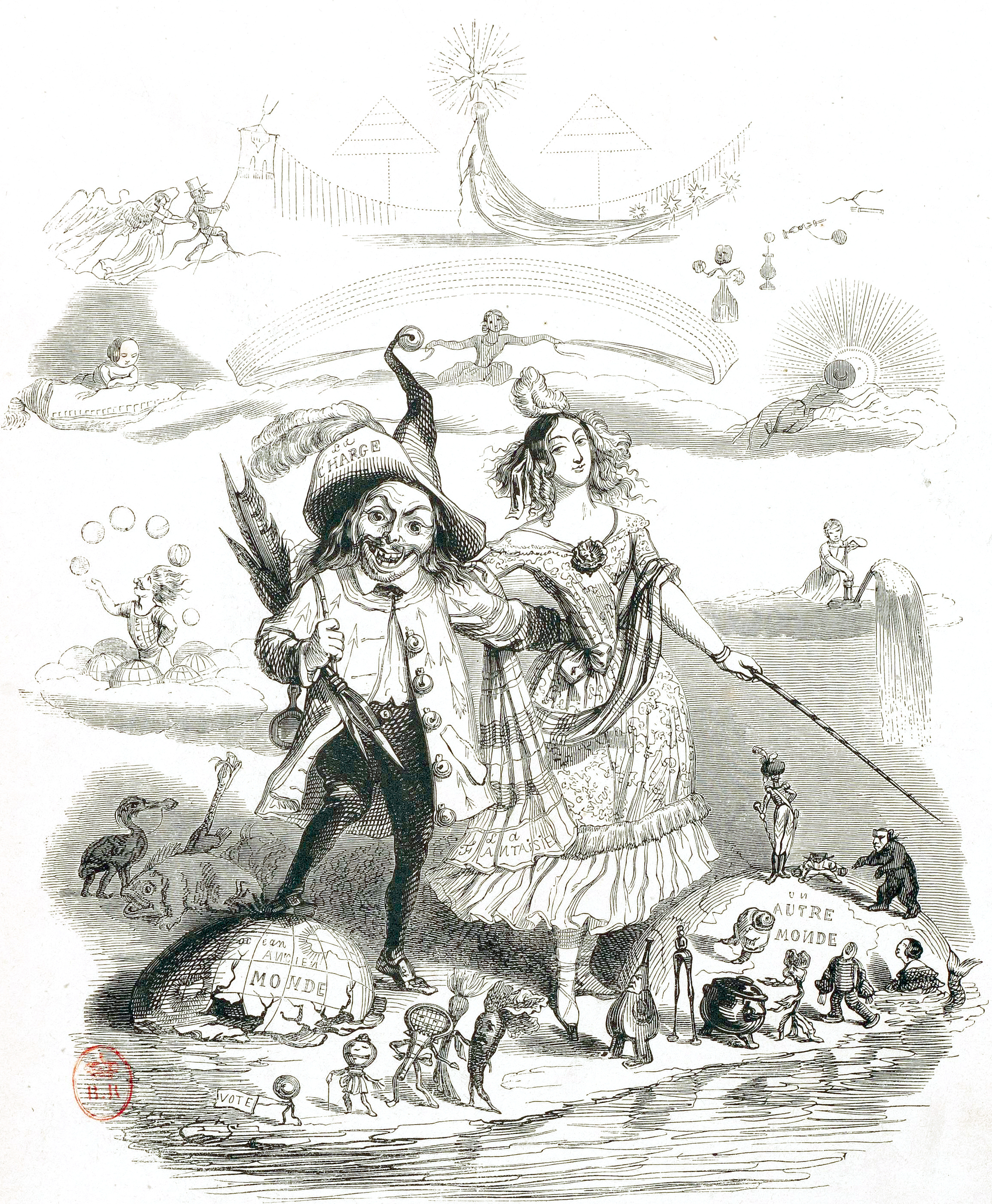
Another World, Frontispice

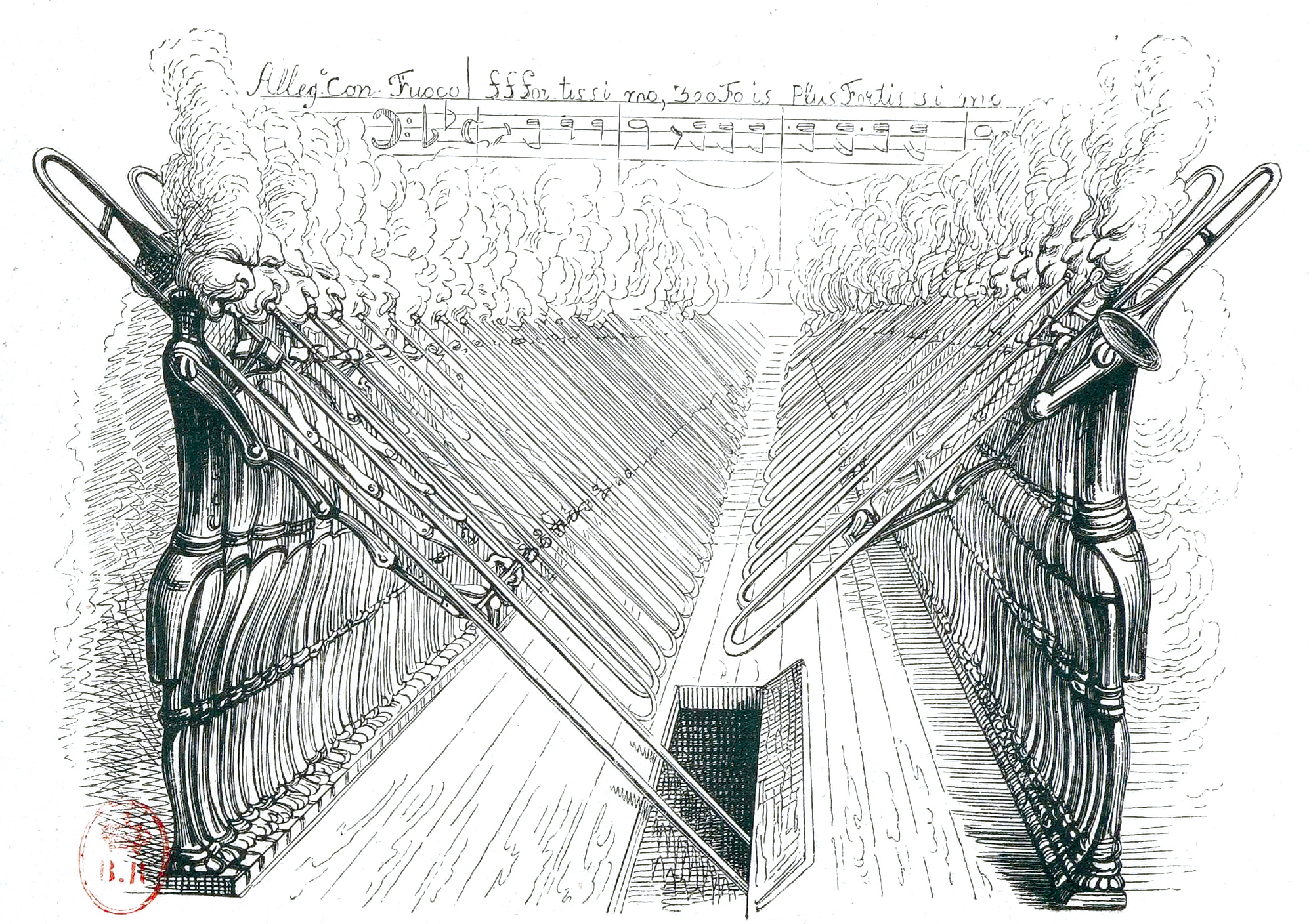
200 Trombones Performing a Tune from the Symphony

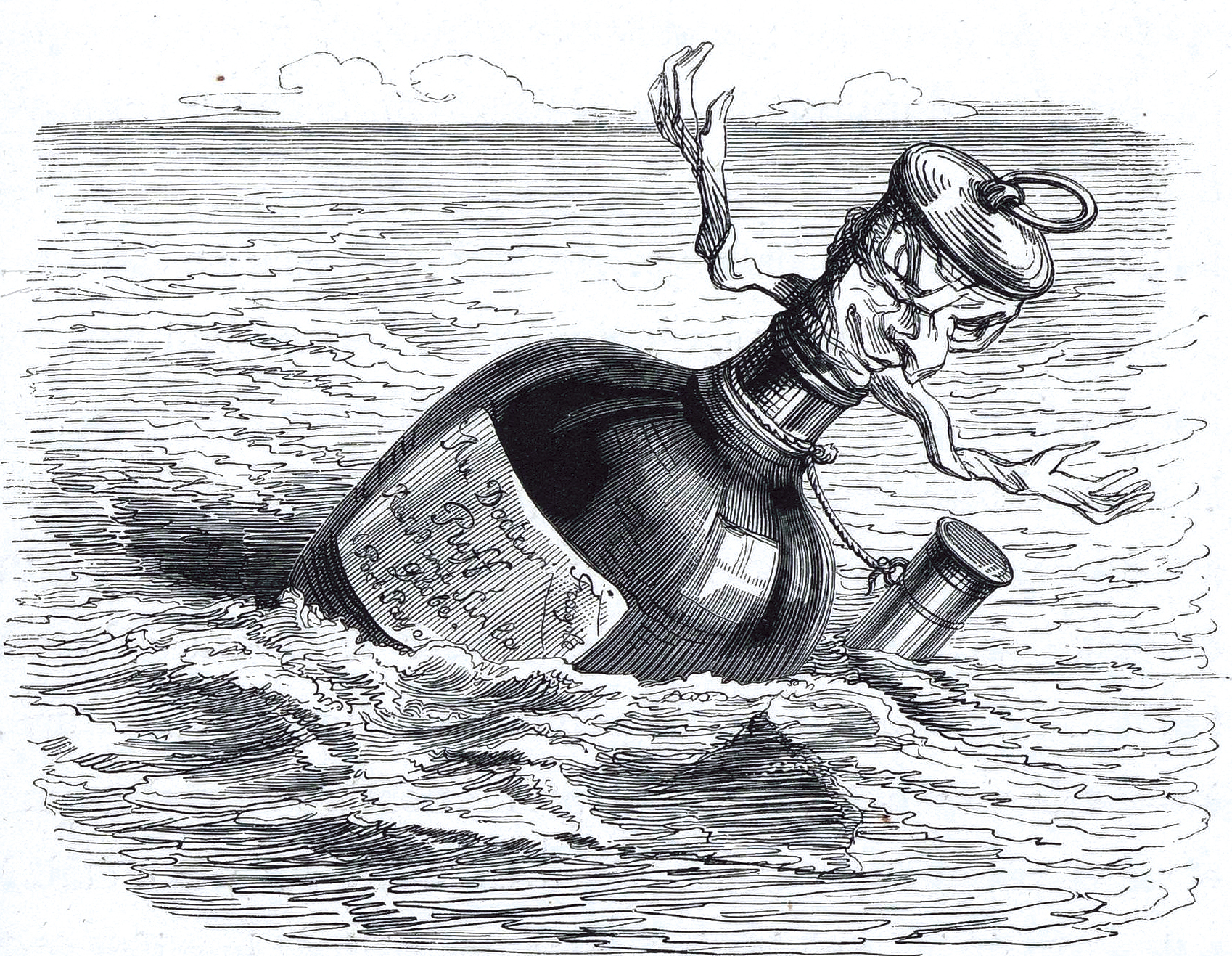
In a Case Attached to the Bottle was a Manuscript

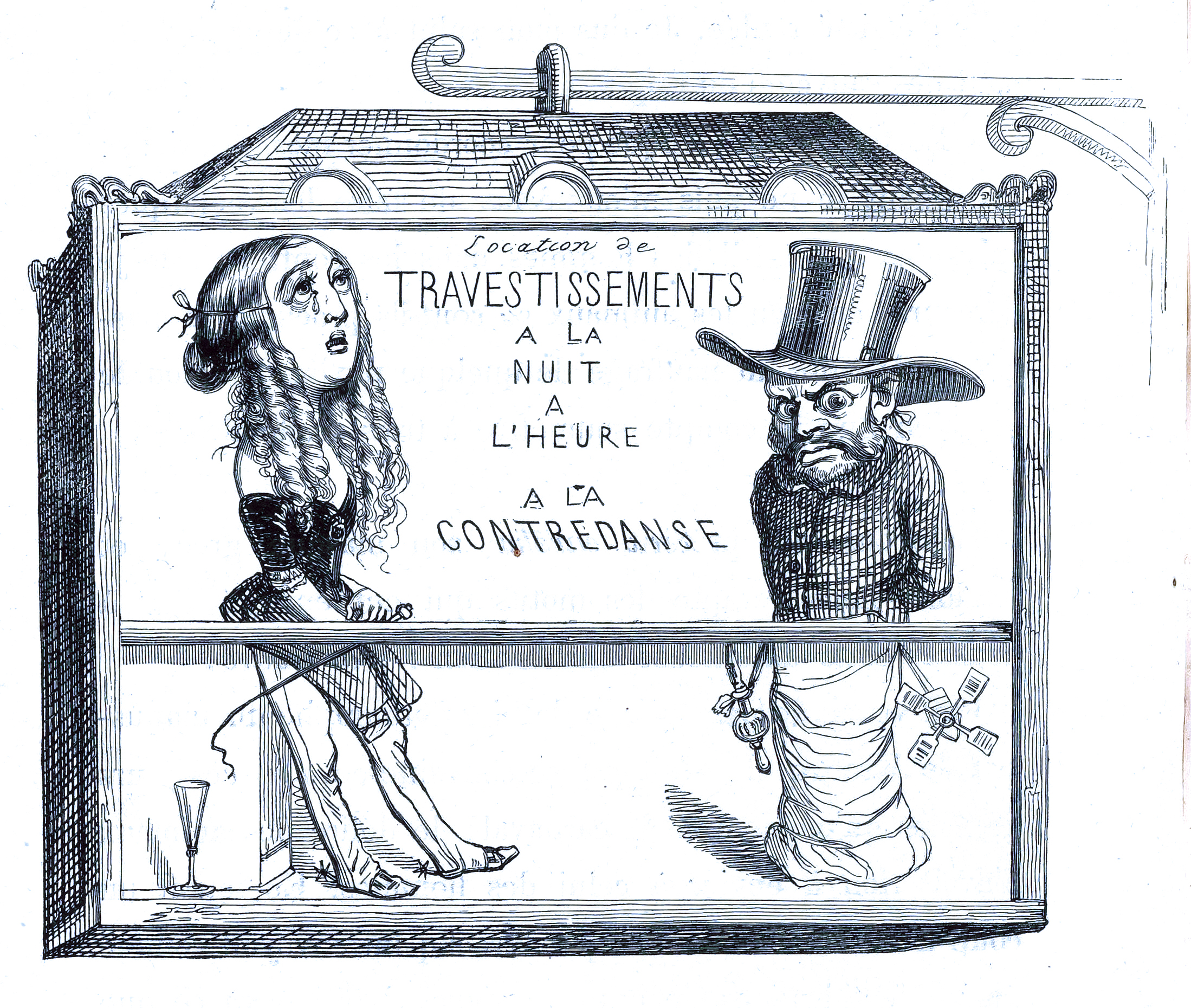
Puff's Shop Sign for Transvestite Disguises

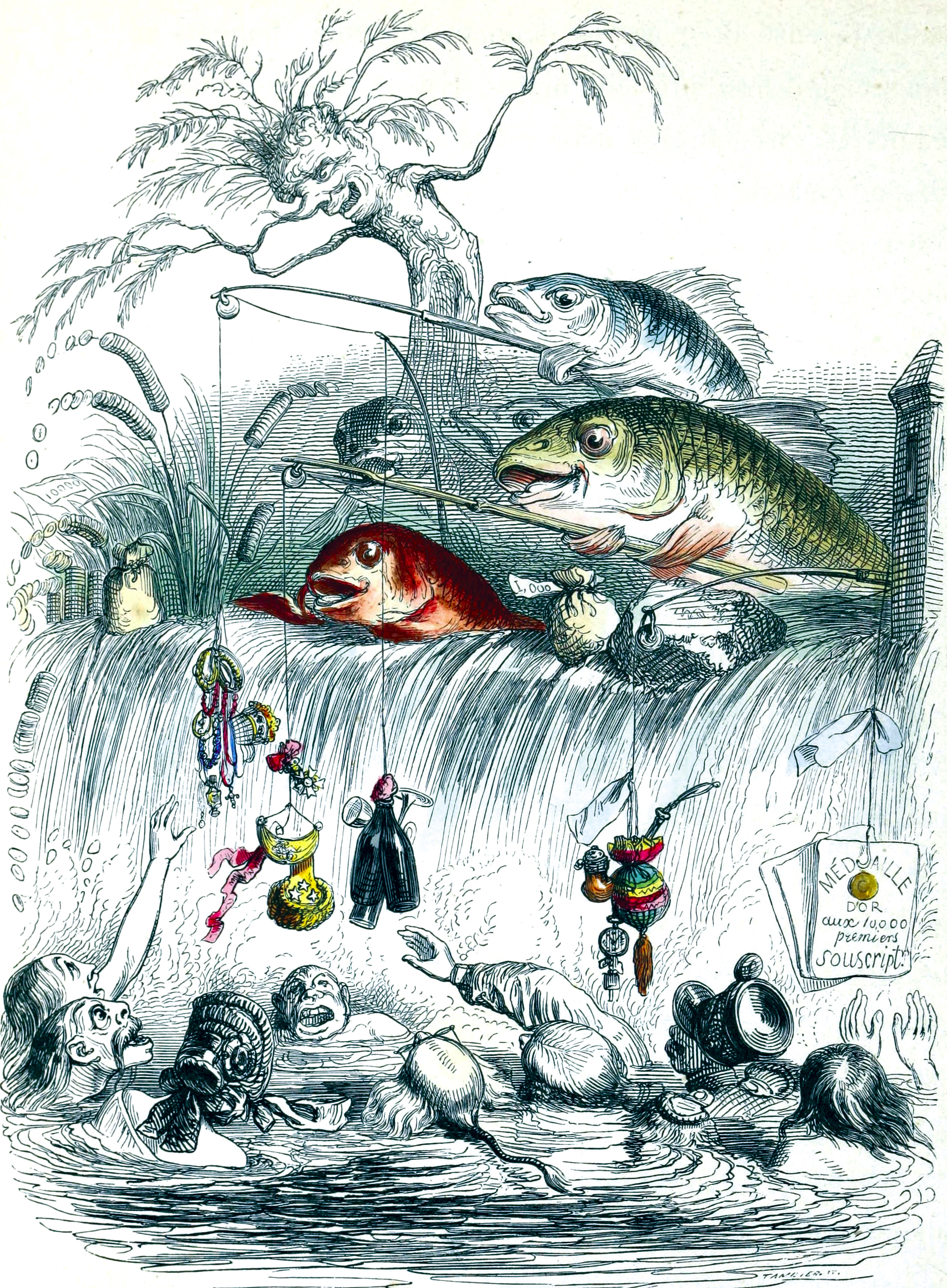
An April Voyage

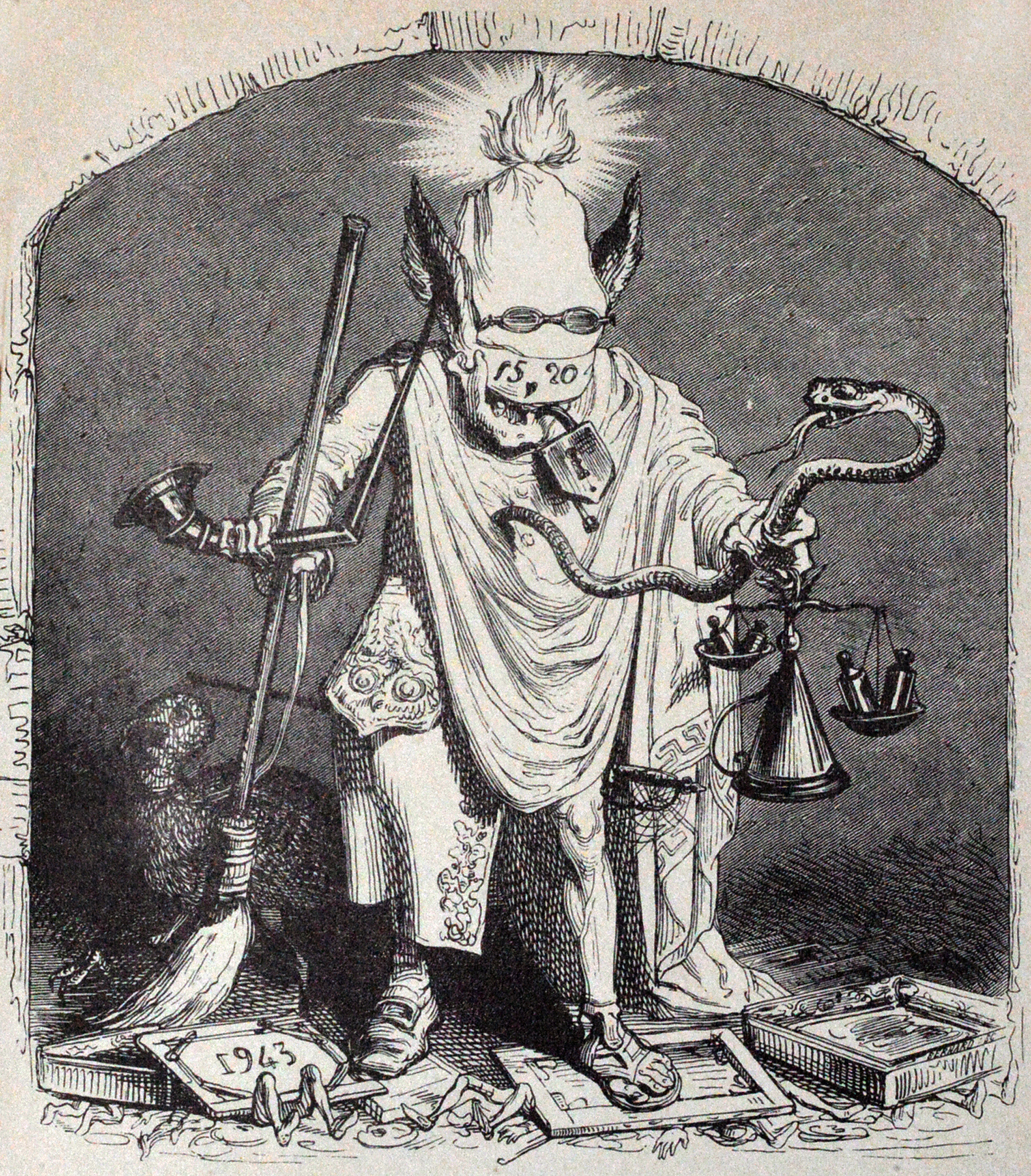
Blind, Deaf, and Impartial Judge

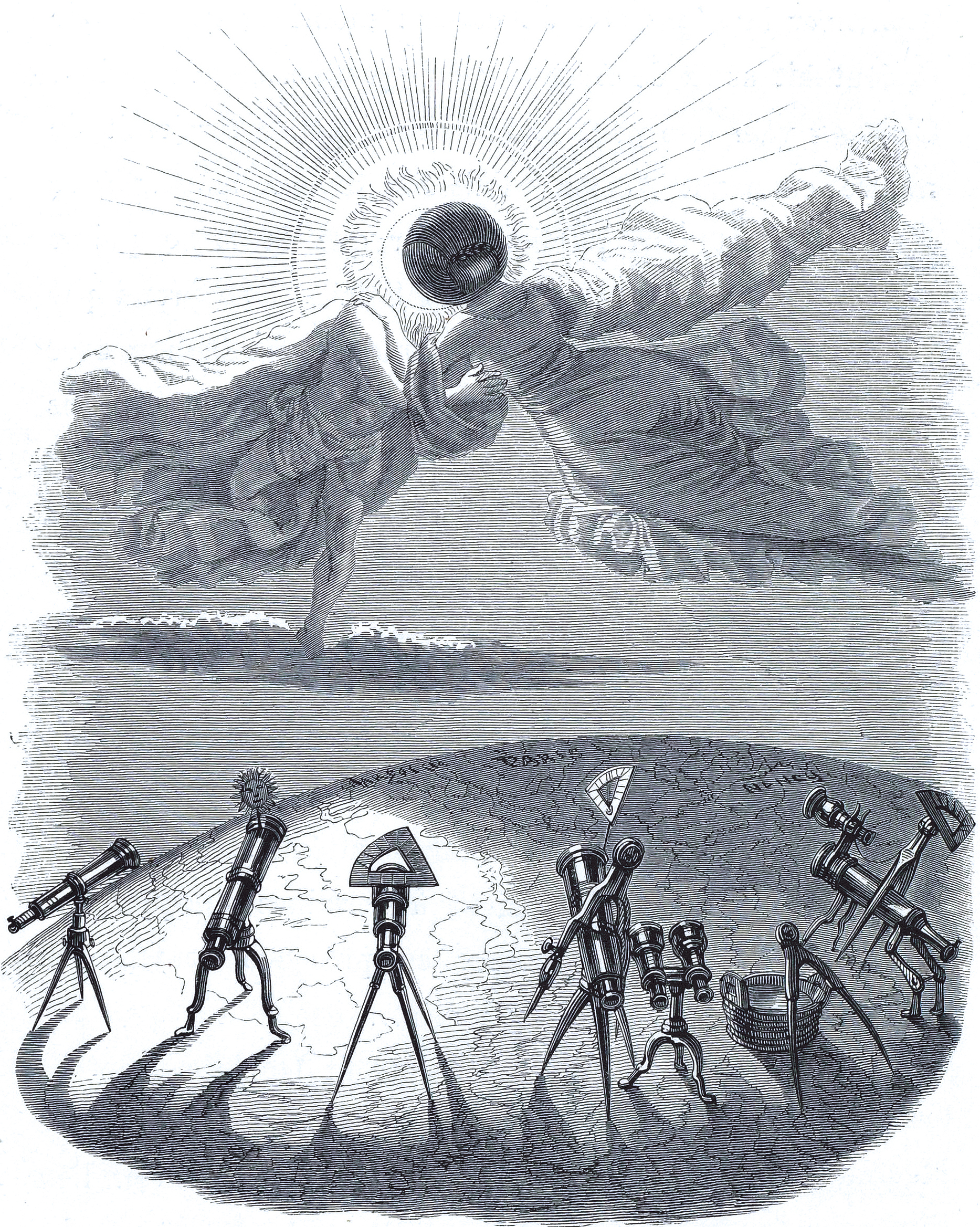
Conjugal Eclipse

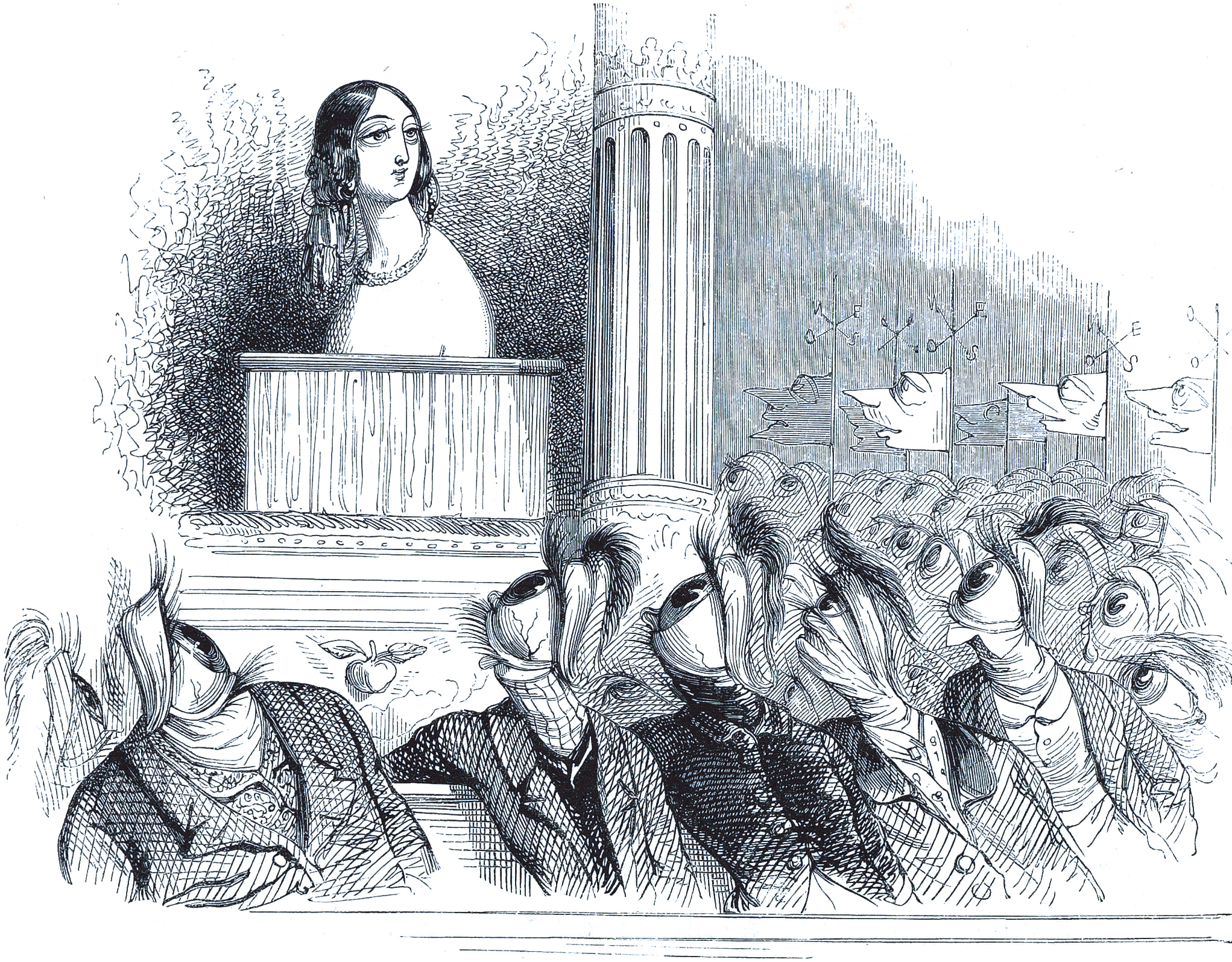
Venus of the Opera

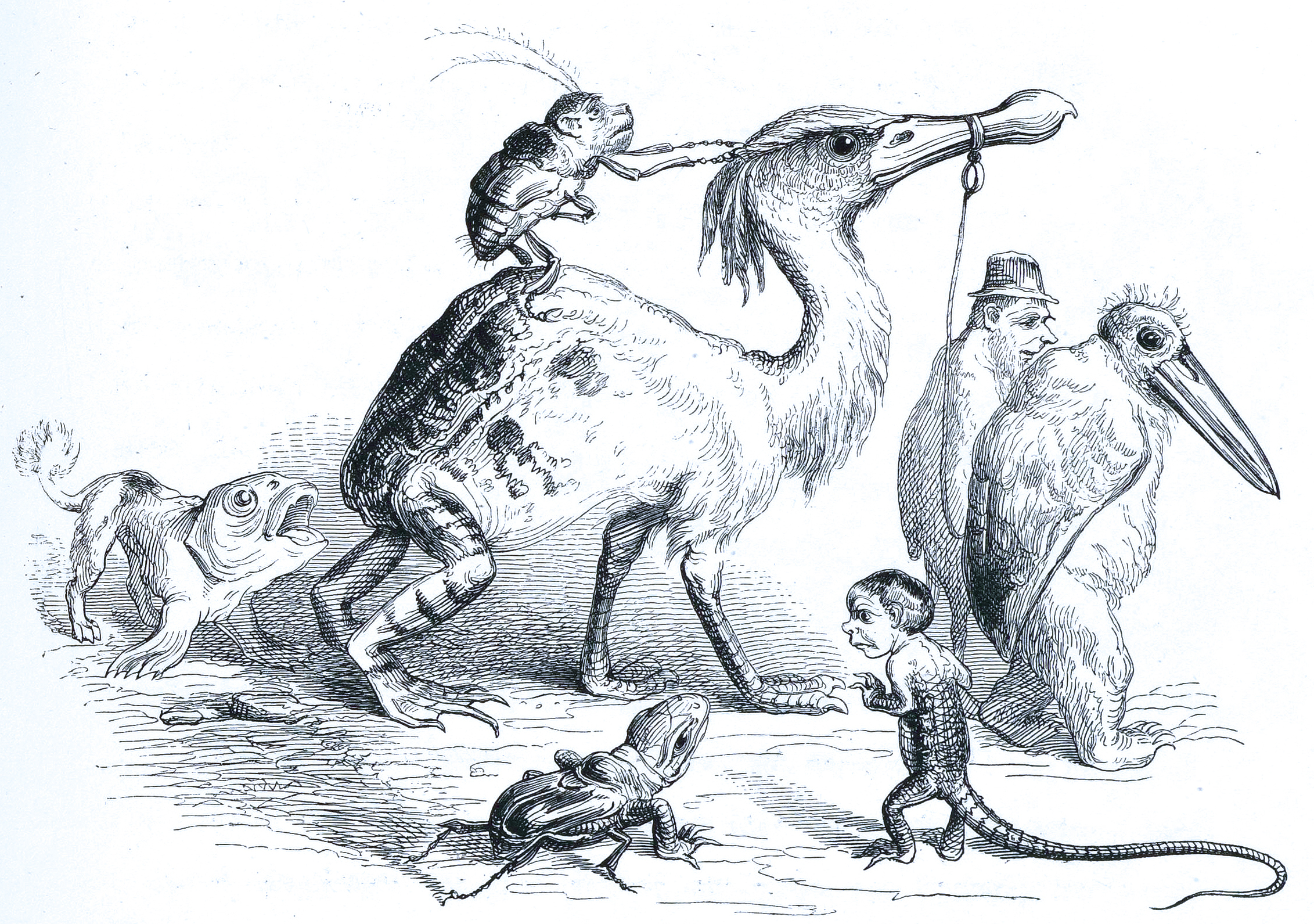
An Amphibious Dromedary

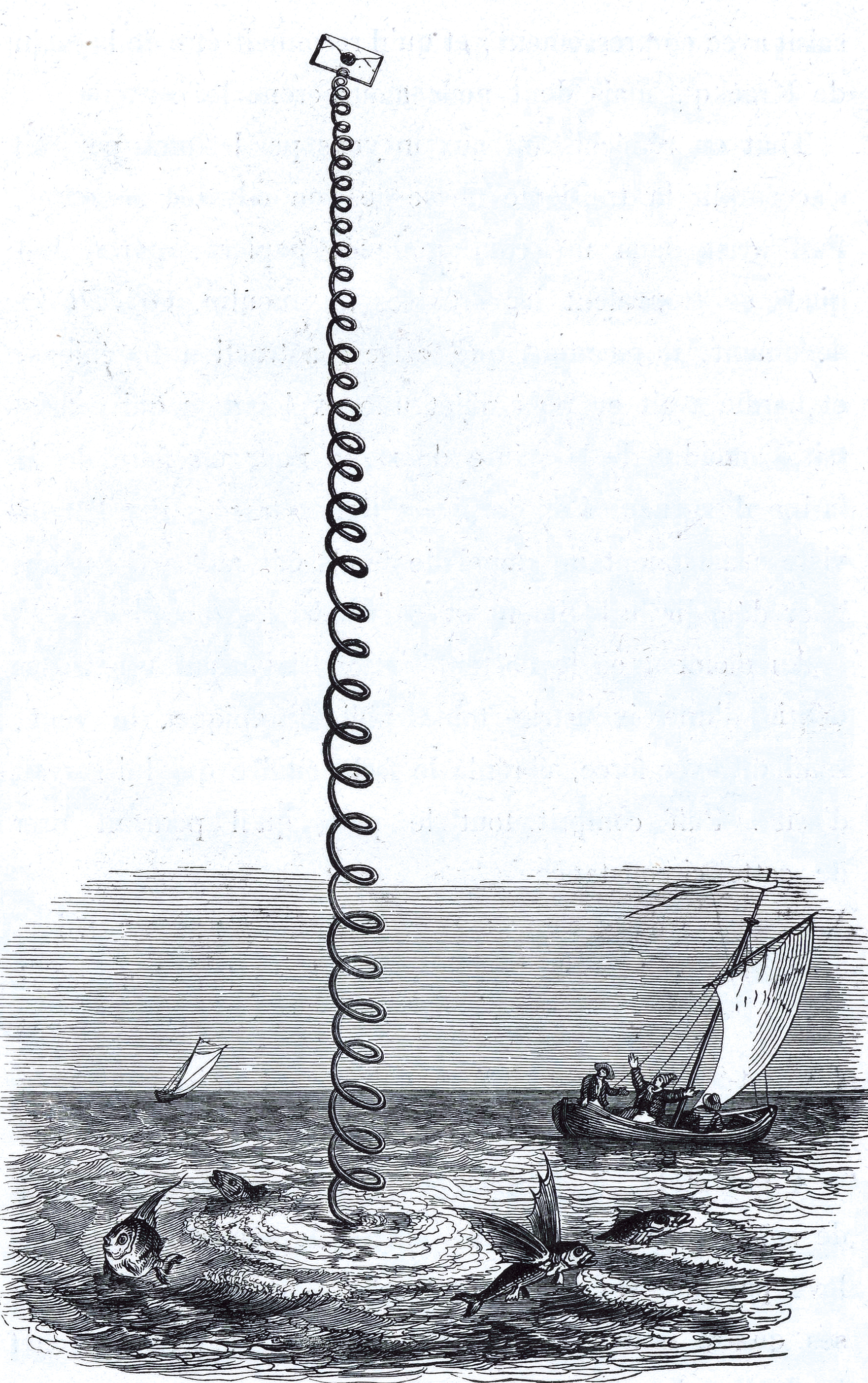
An Elastic Rocket

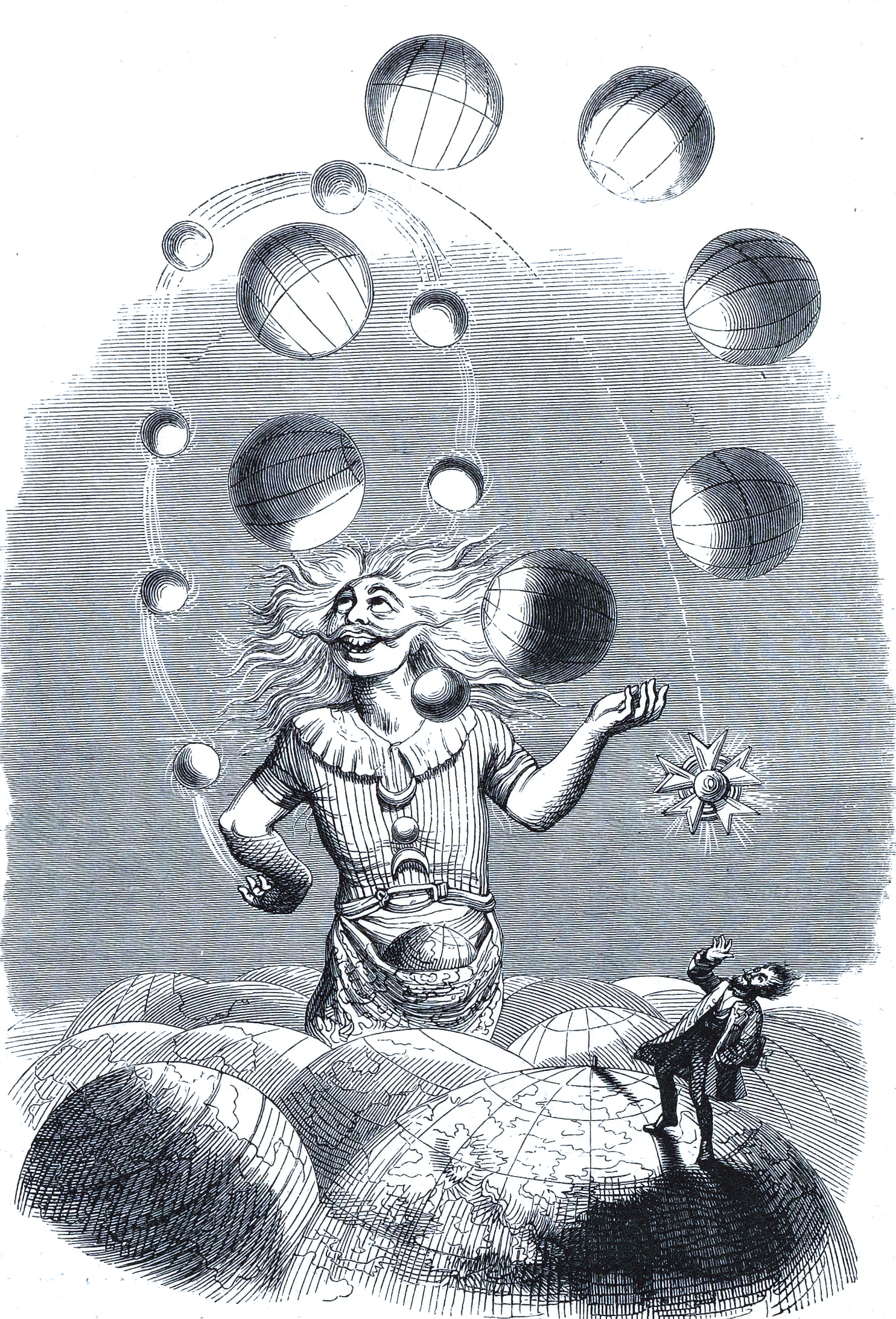
A Magician with the Planets

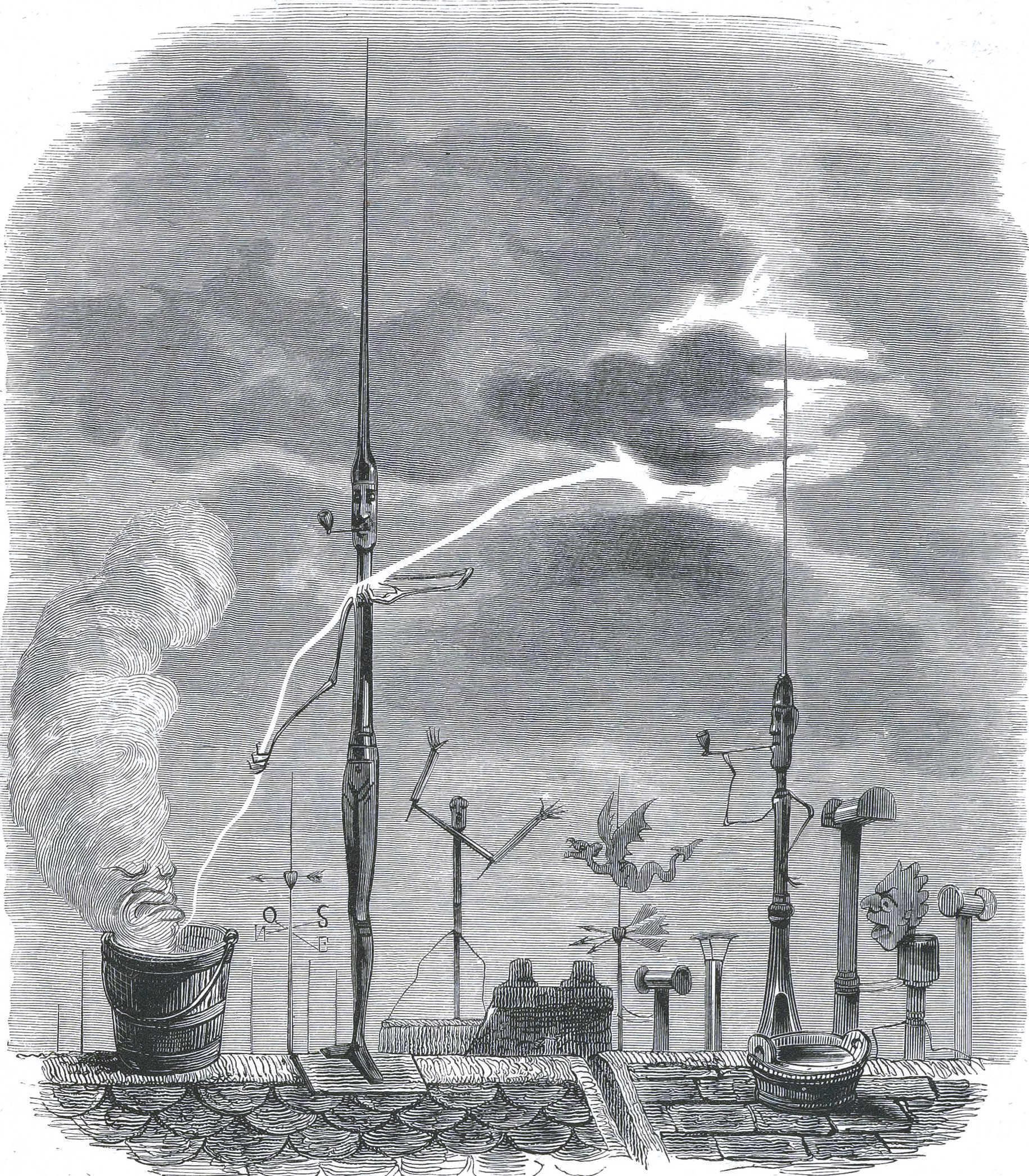
Summer Chose this Place to Make its Thunder

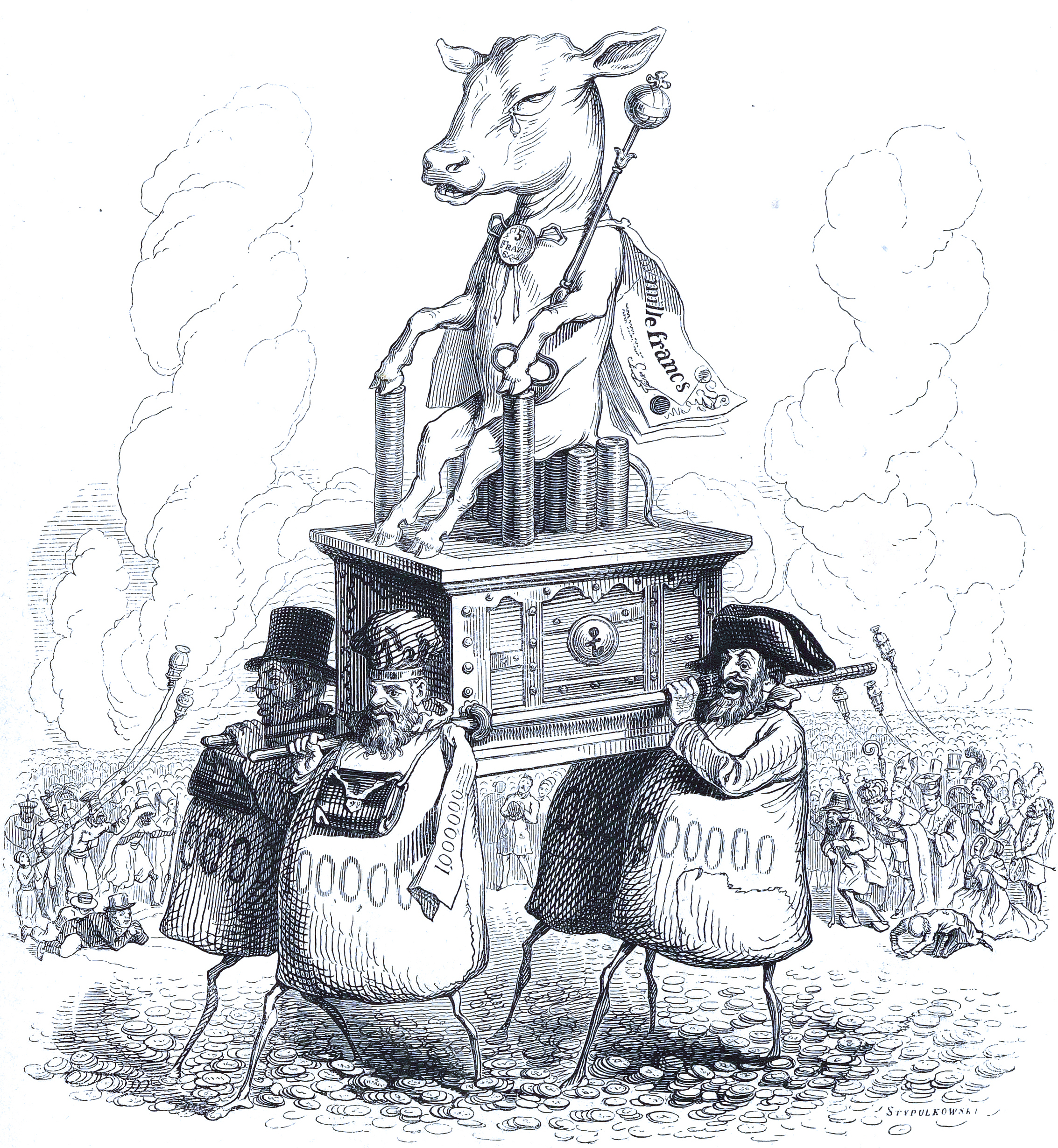
Gold is a Chimera

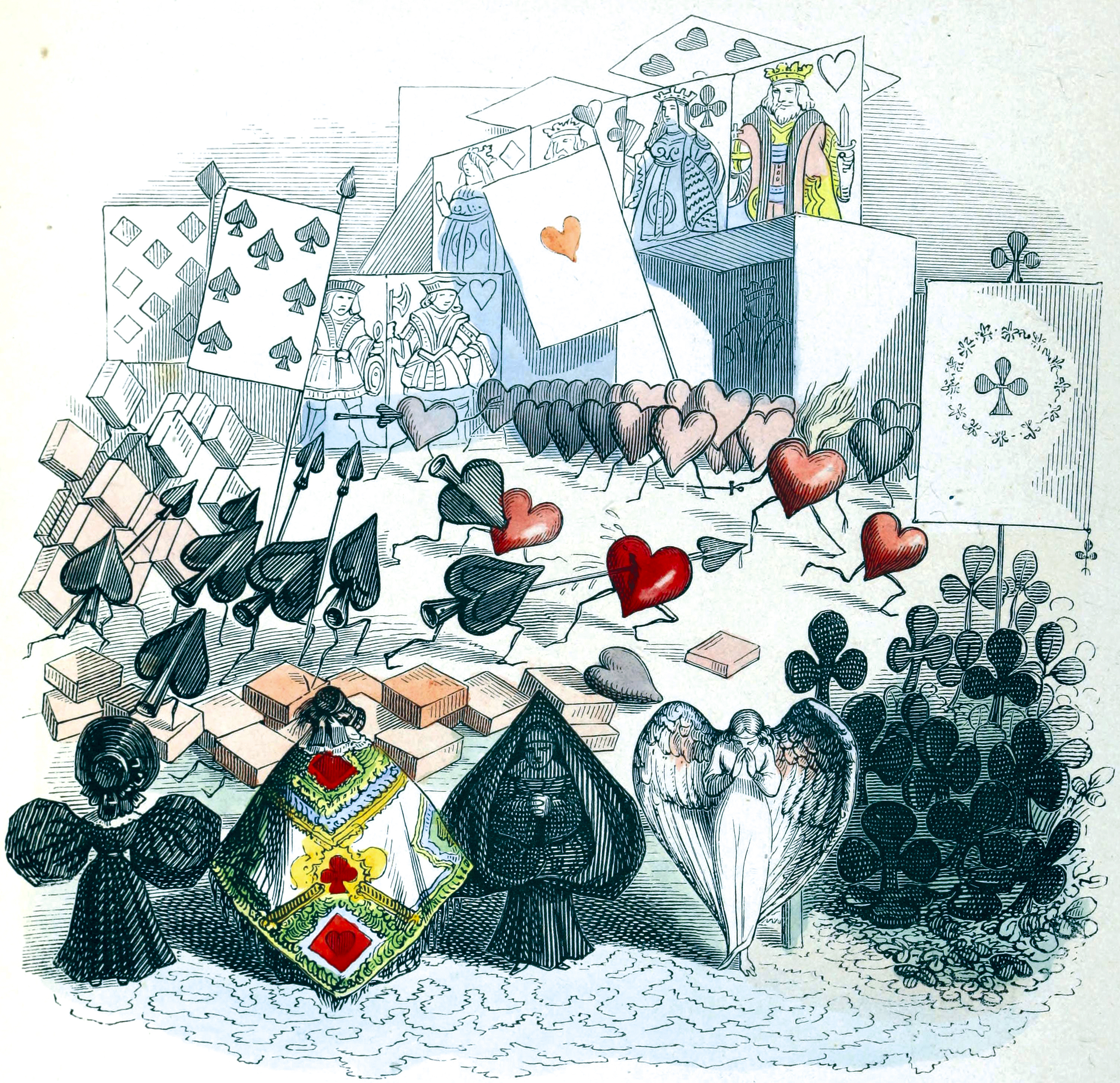
The Battle of the Cards

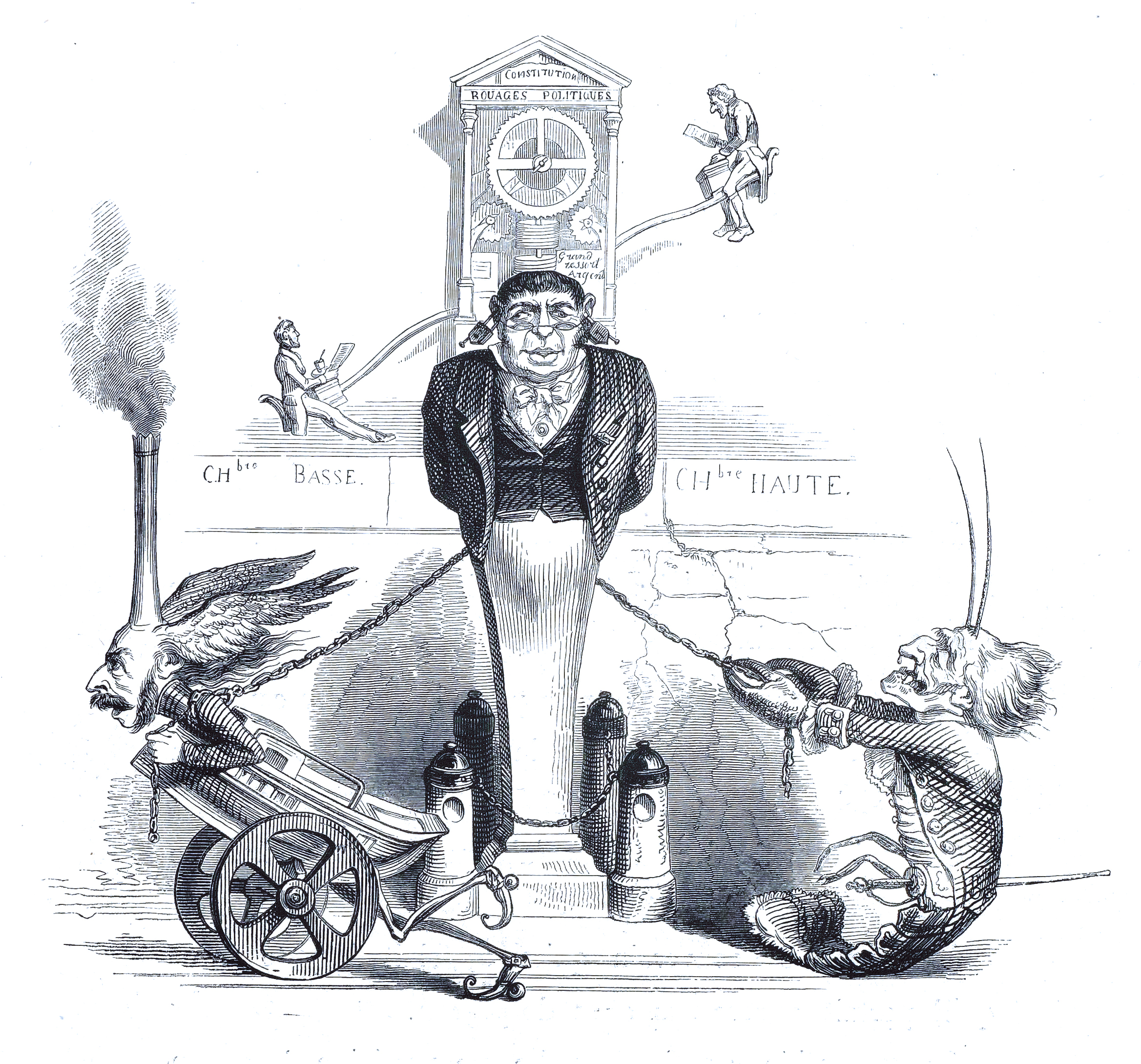
His Skill Consist of Being Immobile

Jérôme Paturot à la recherche d'une position sociale (1846), wood engravings

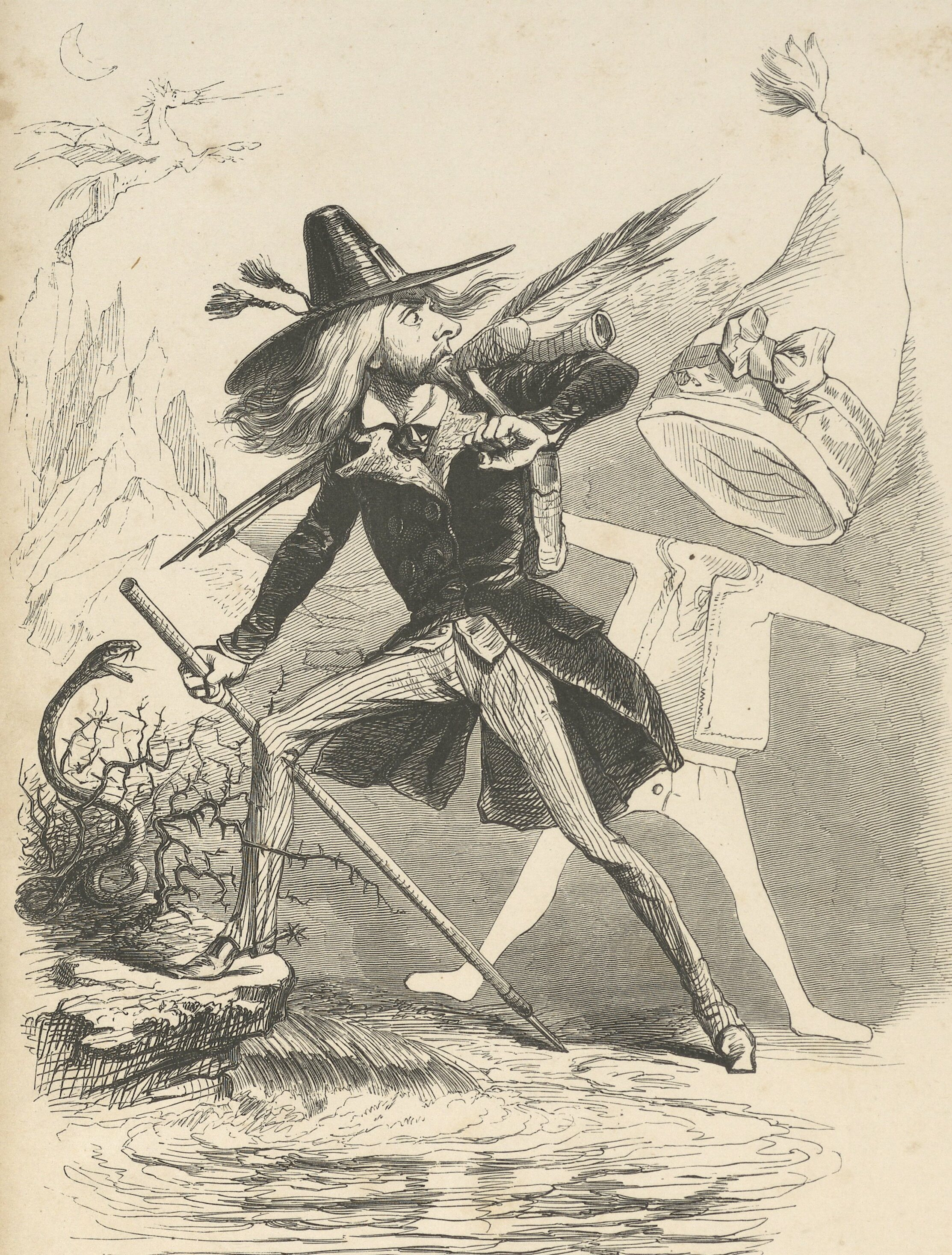
Title page

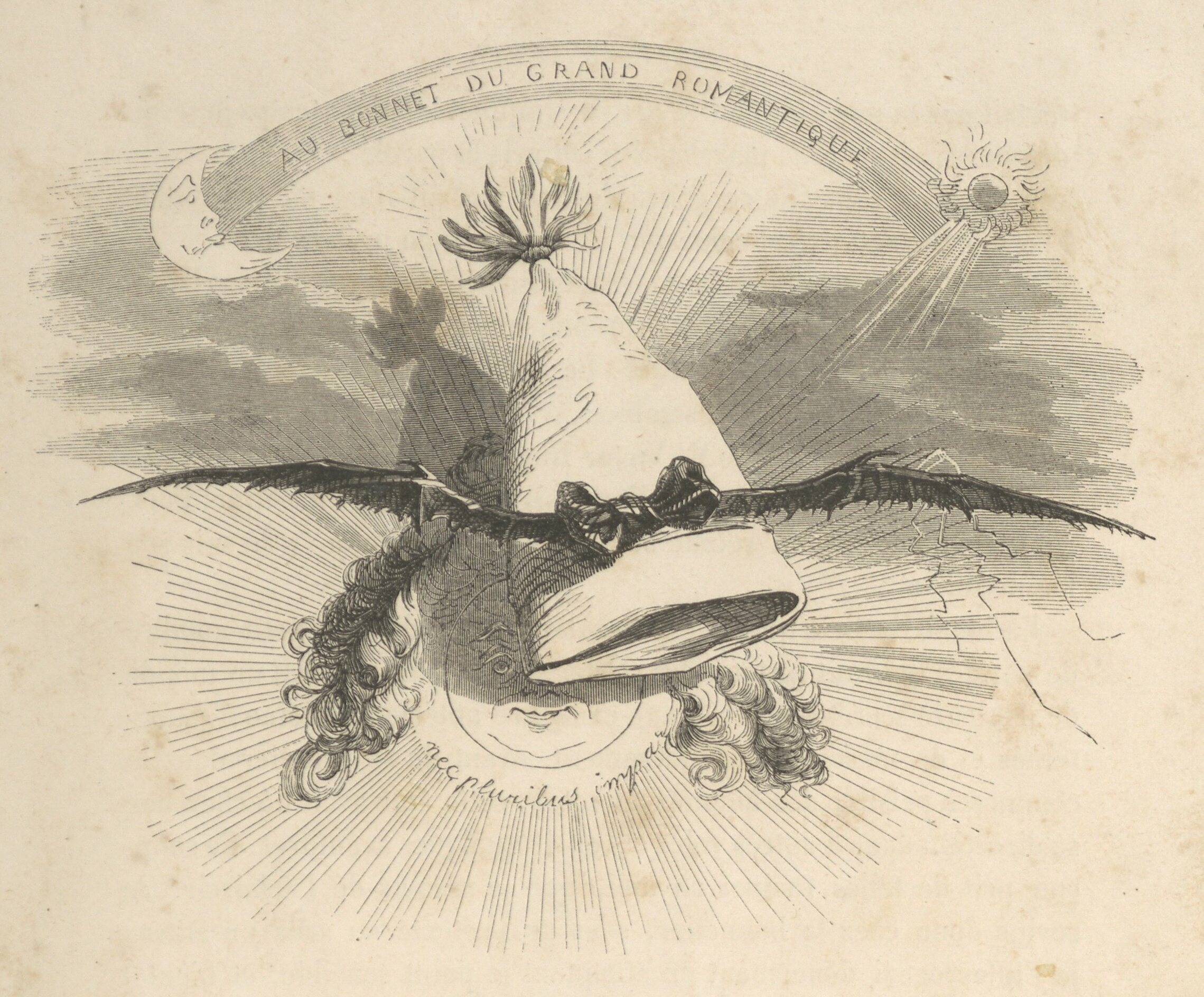
The Bonnet of the Great Romantic

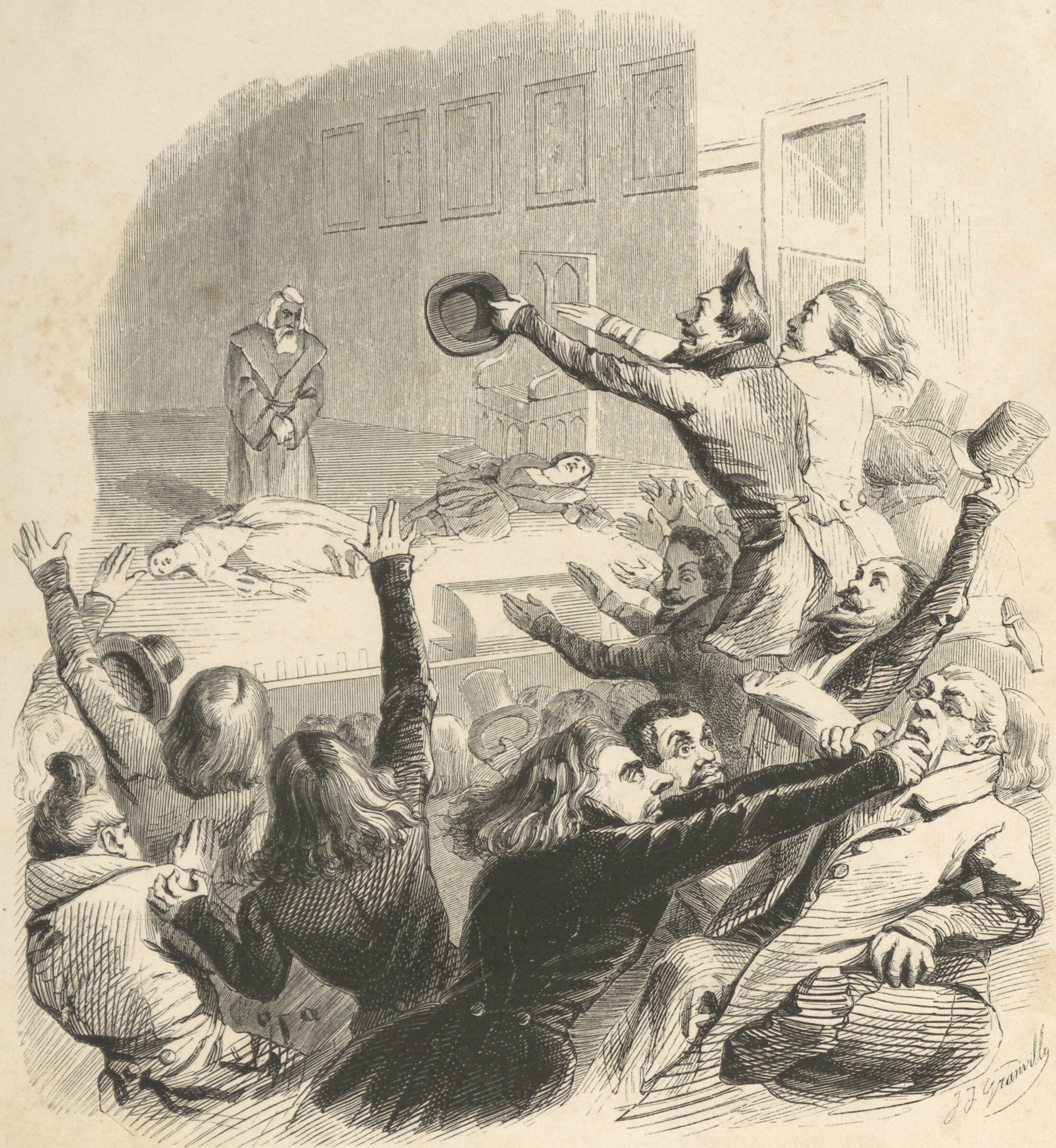
The premiere of Hernani

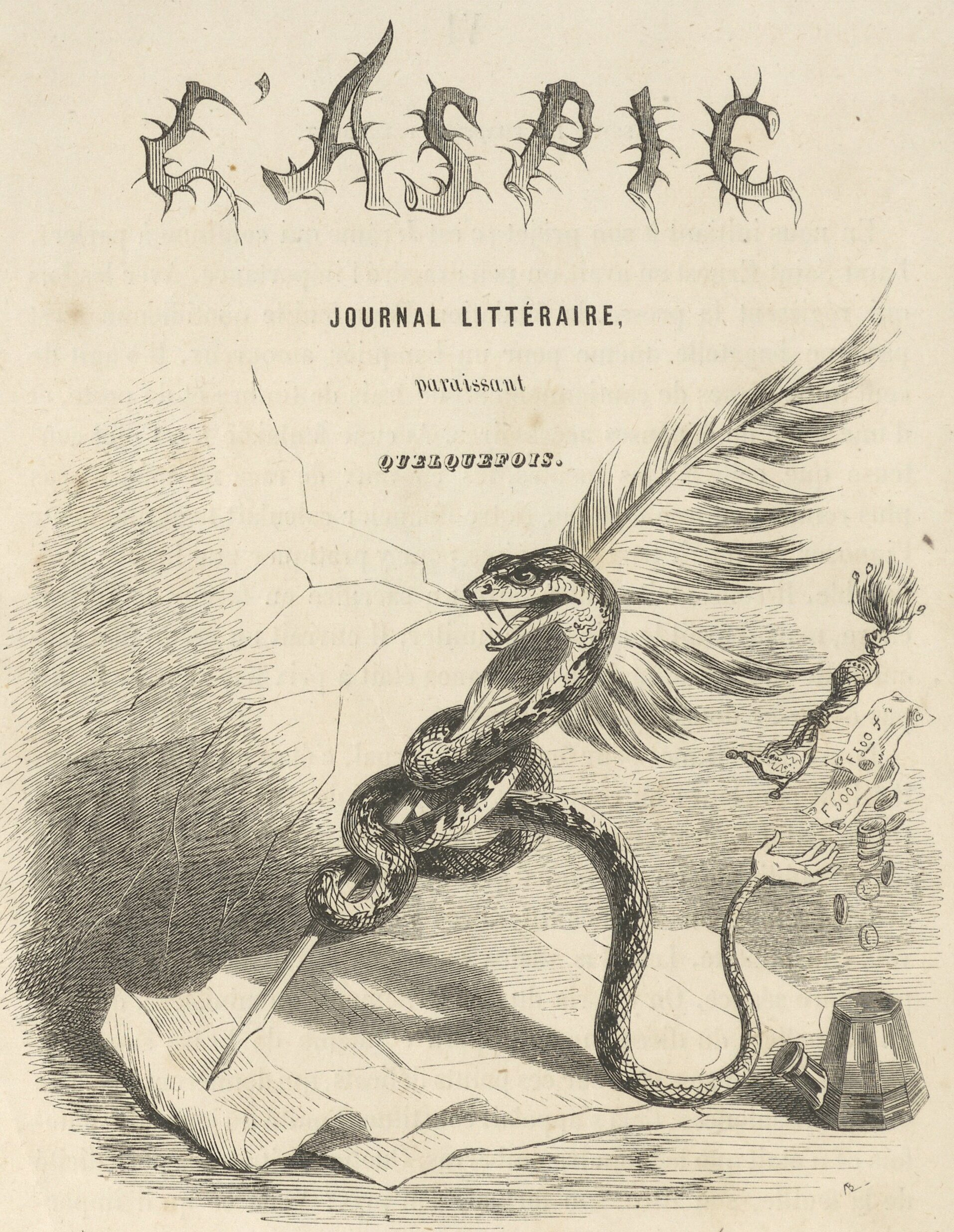
The Asp, Literary Journal

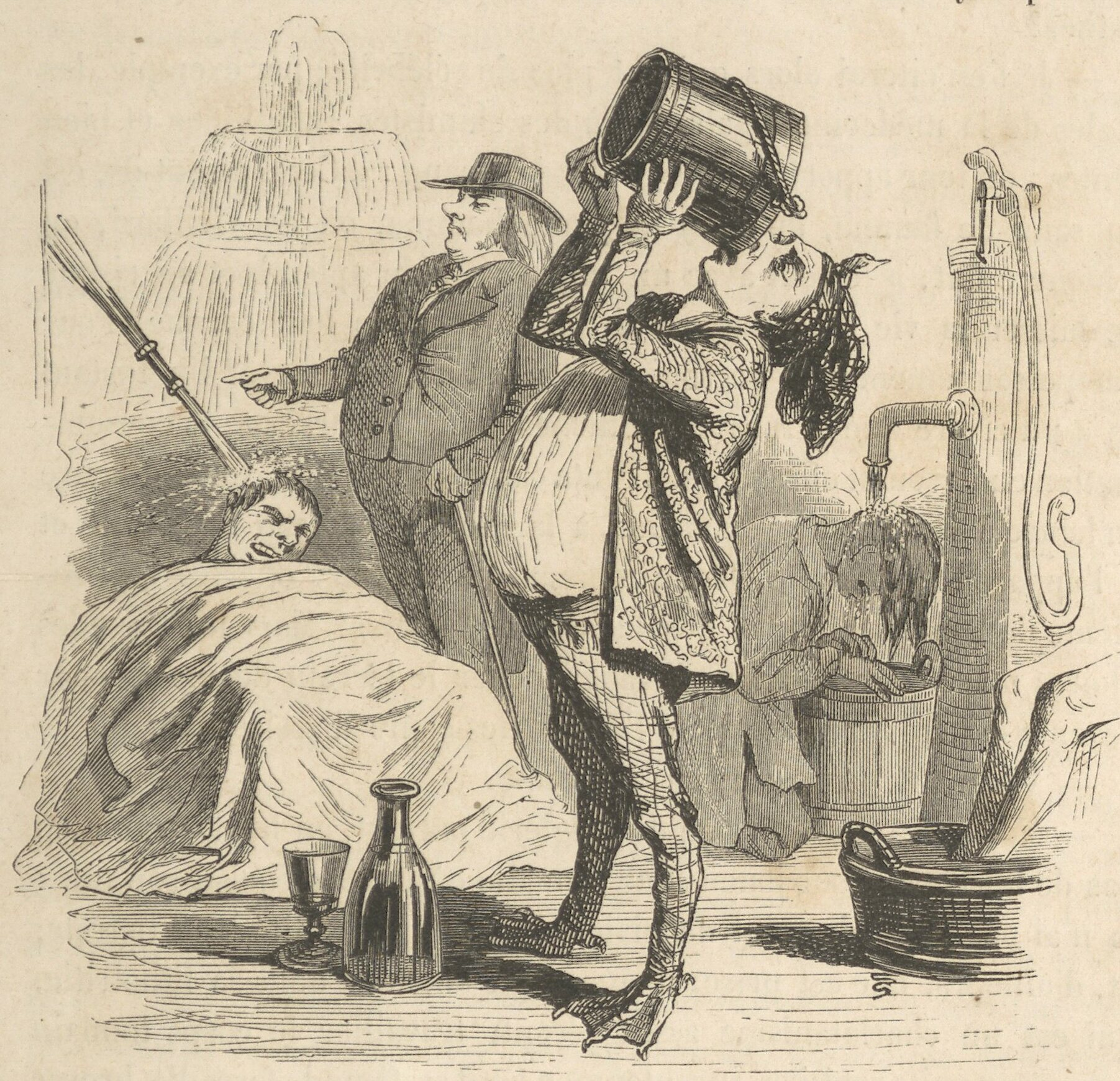
The Water Cure

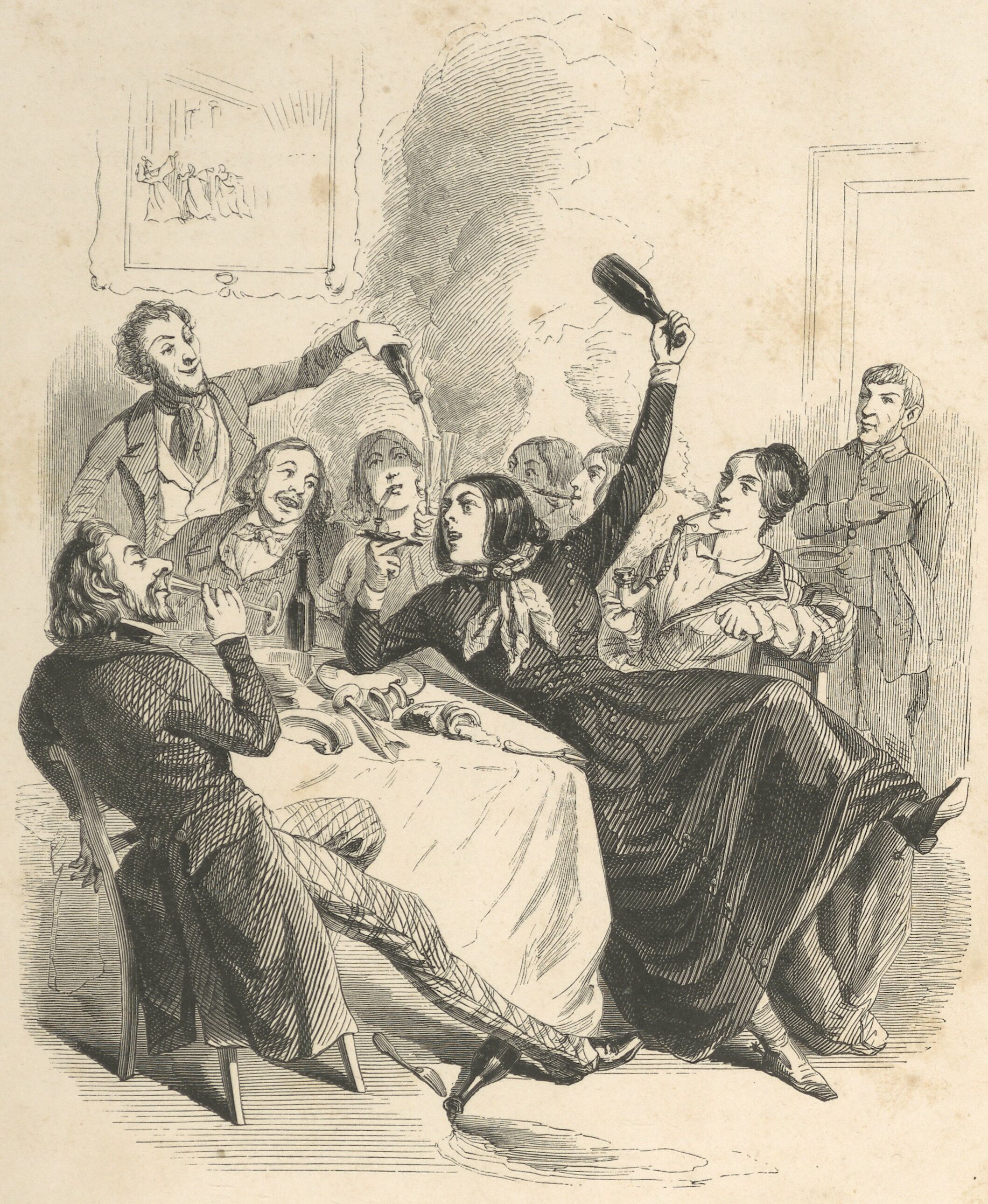
Breakfast with the emancipated

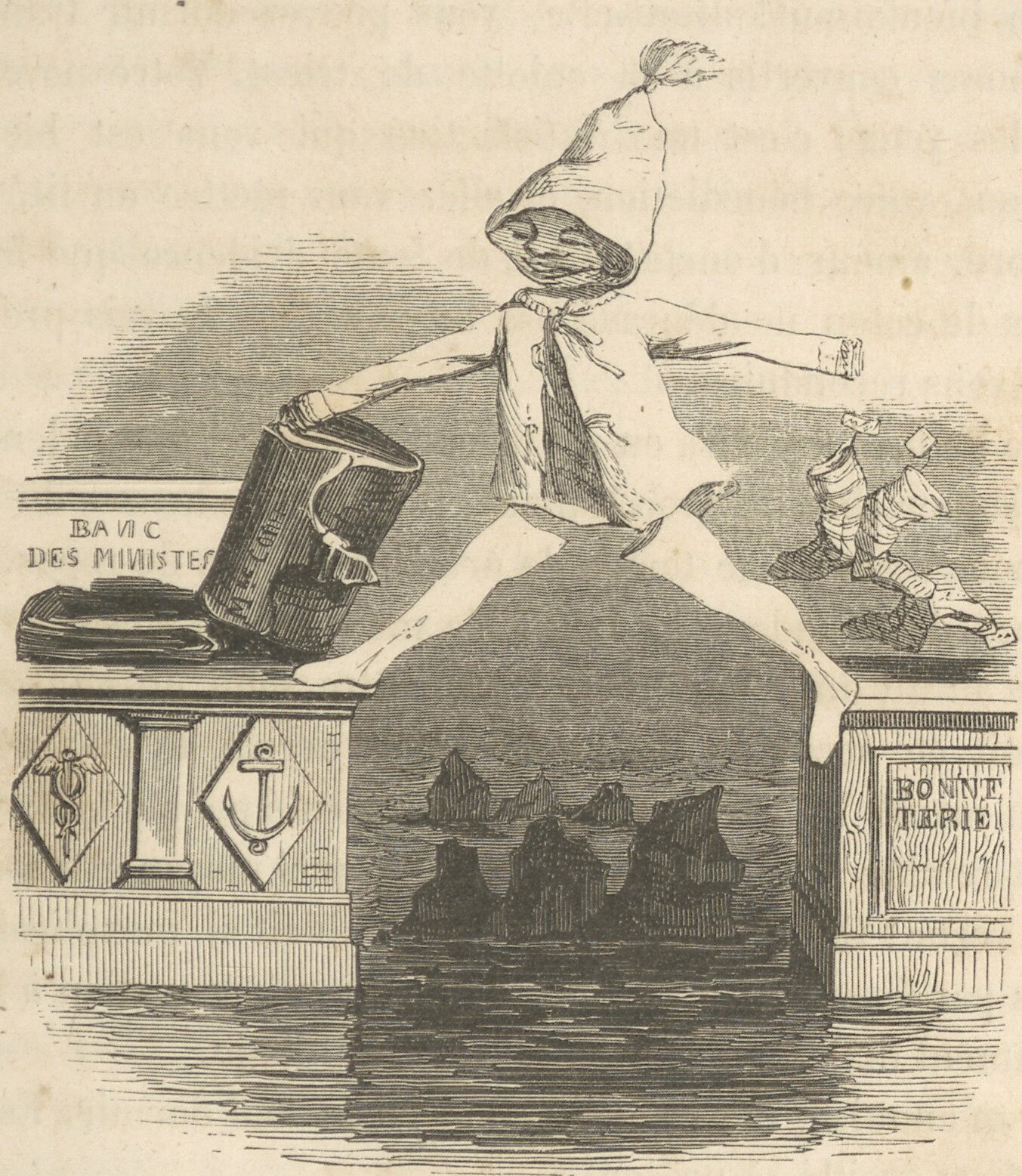
The hat on the move

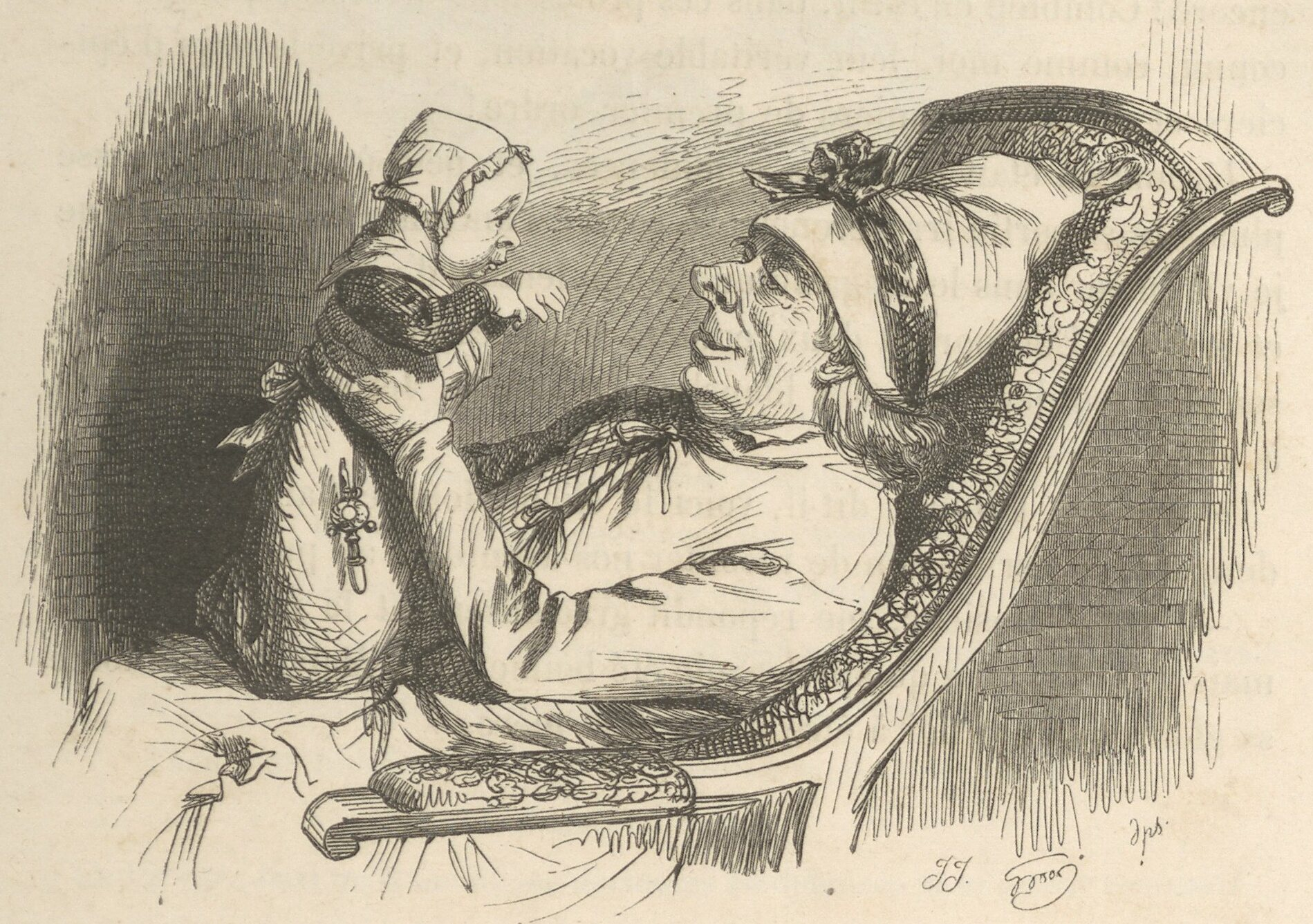
A Small Paturot

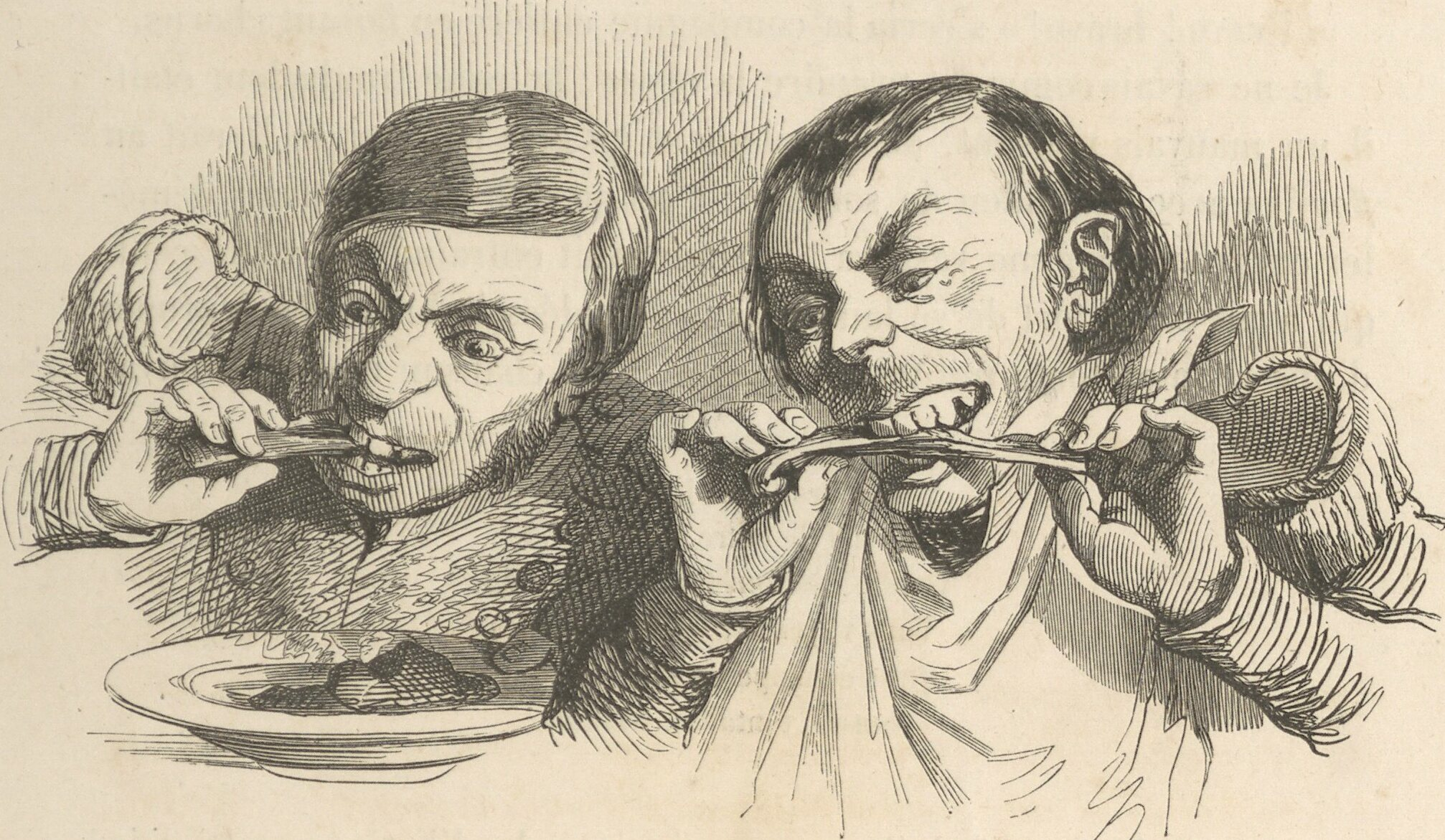
The hungry

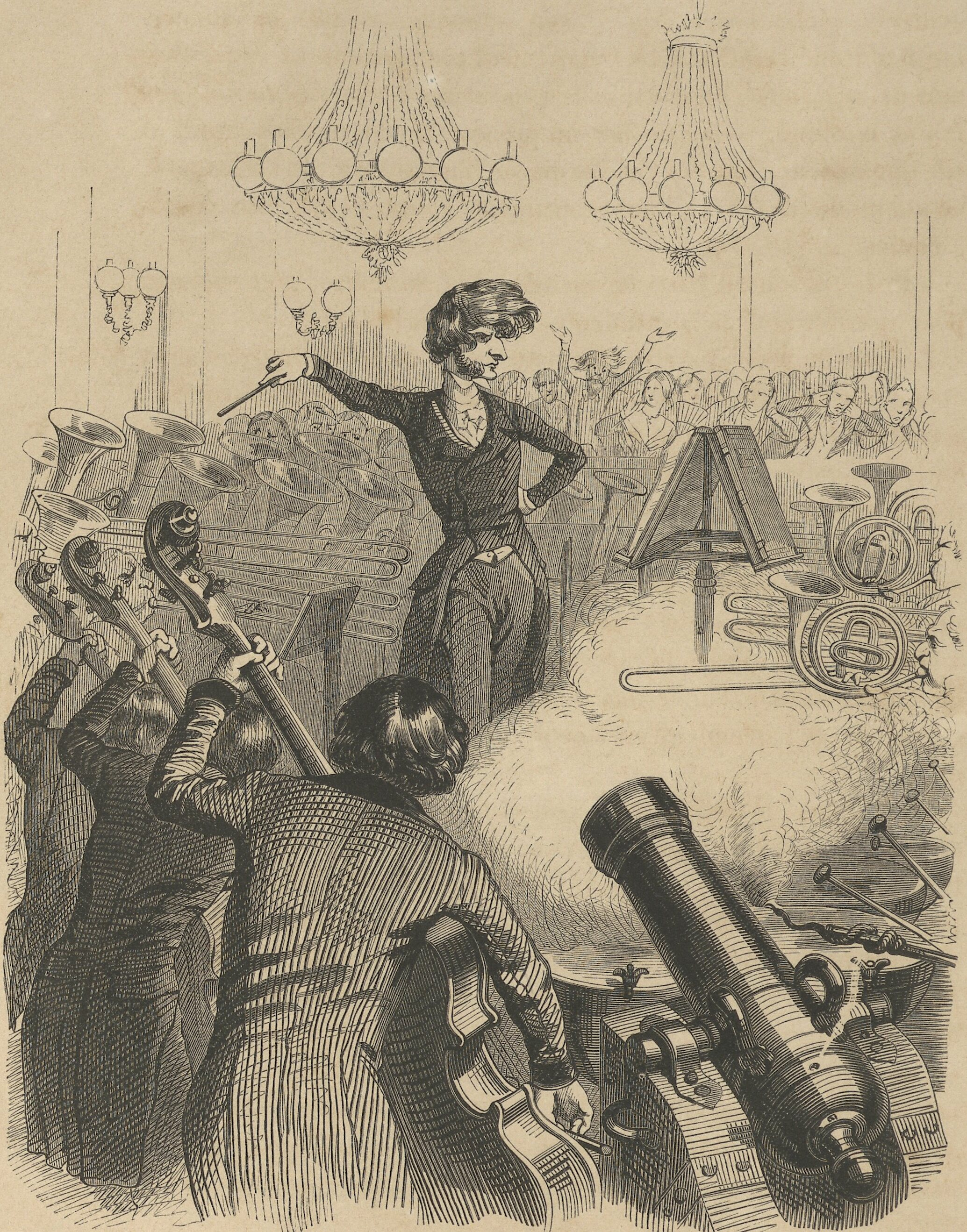
The hall is solid, it can take the strain! (Berlioz)

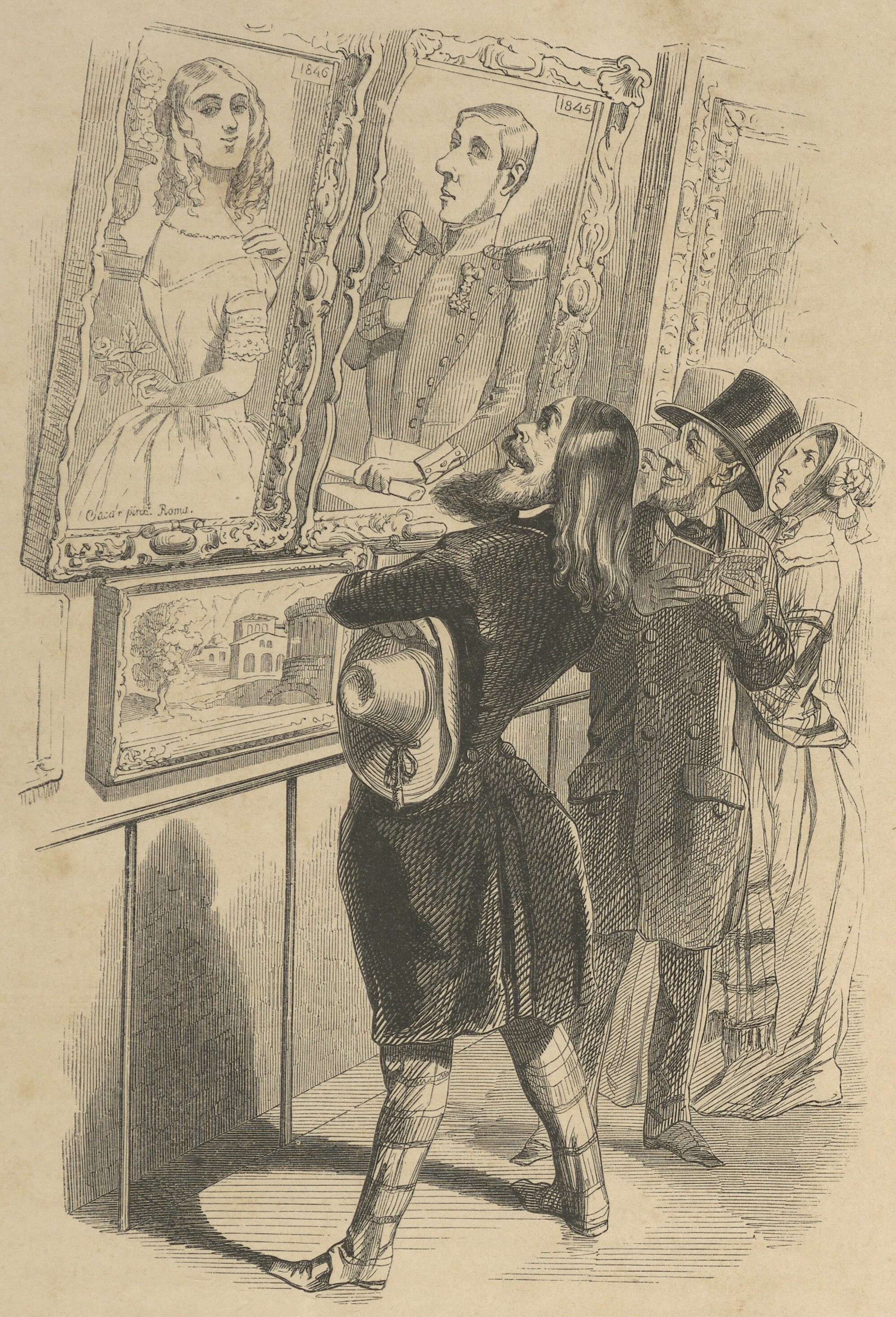
Artist admiring his work

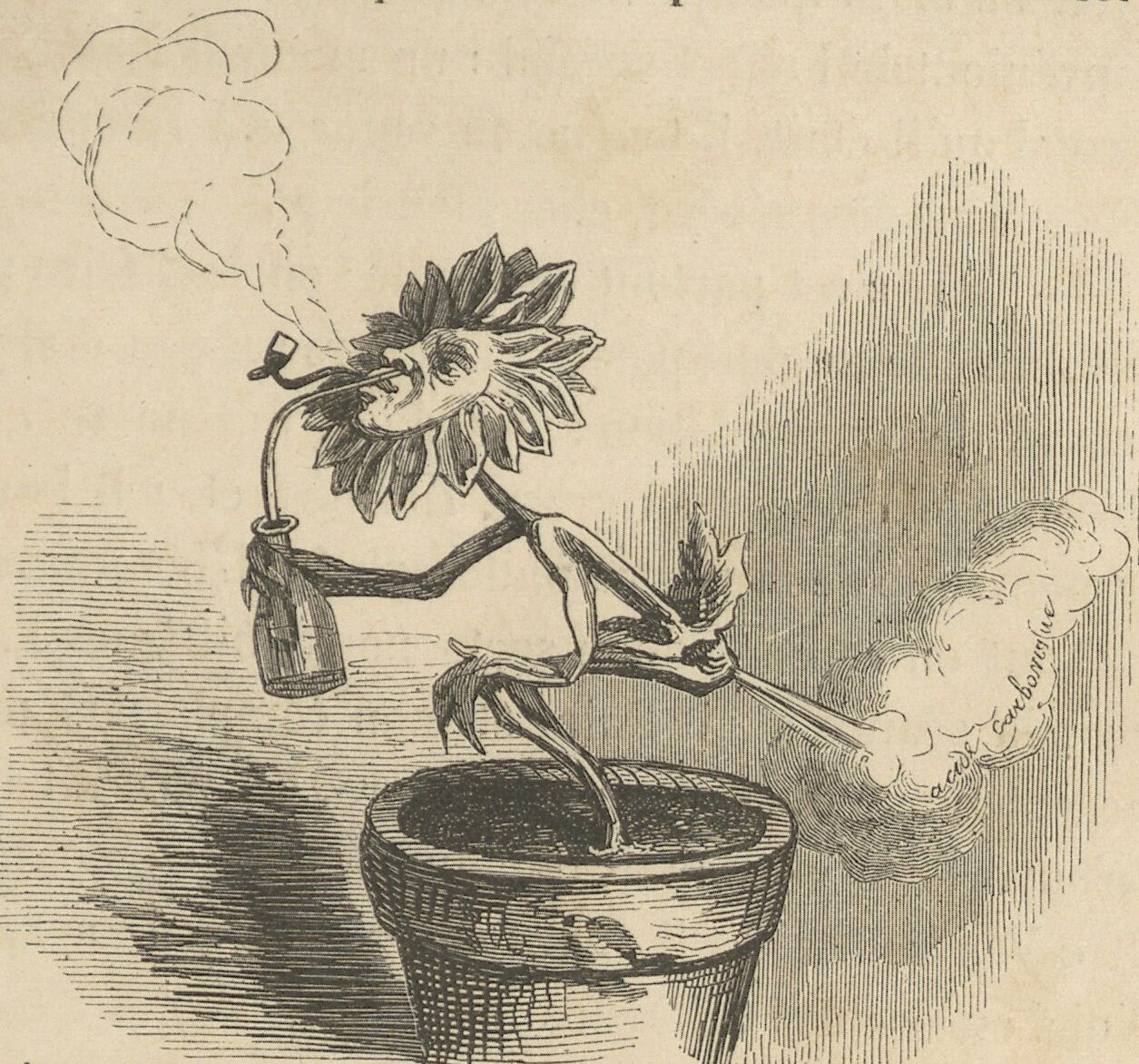
Tobacco

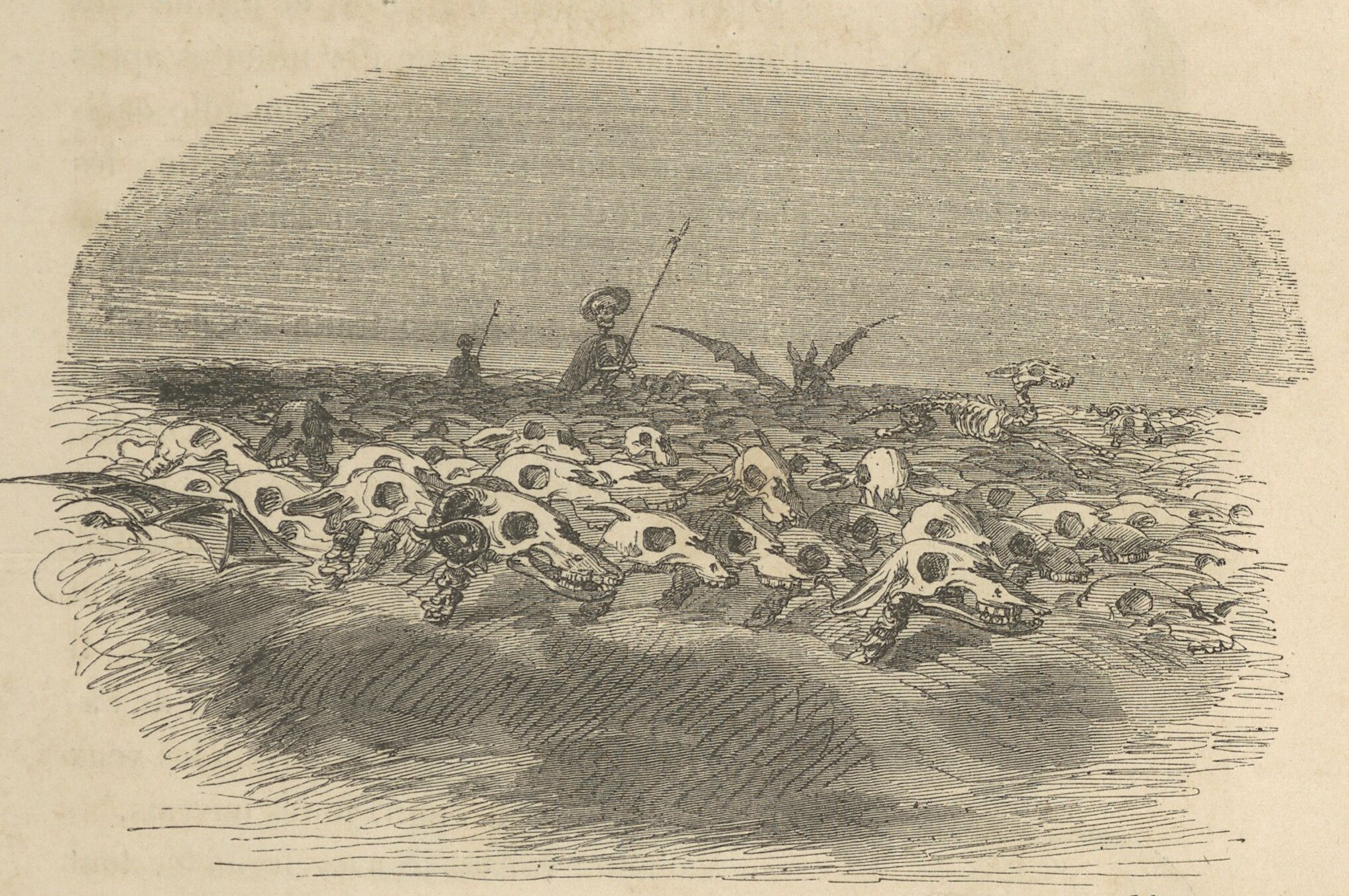
Skeletons of the Moon Sheep

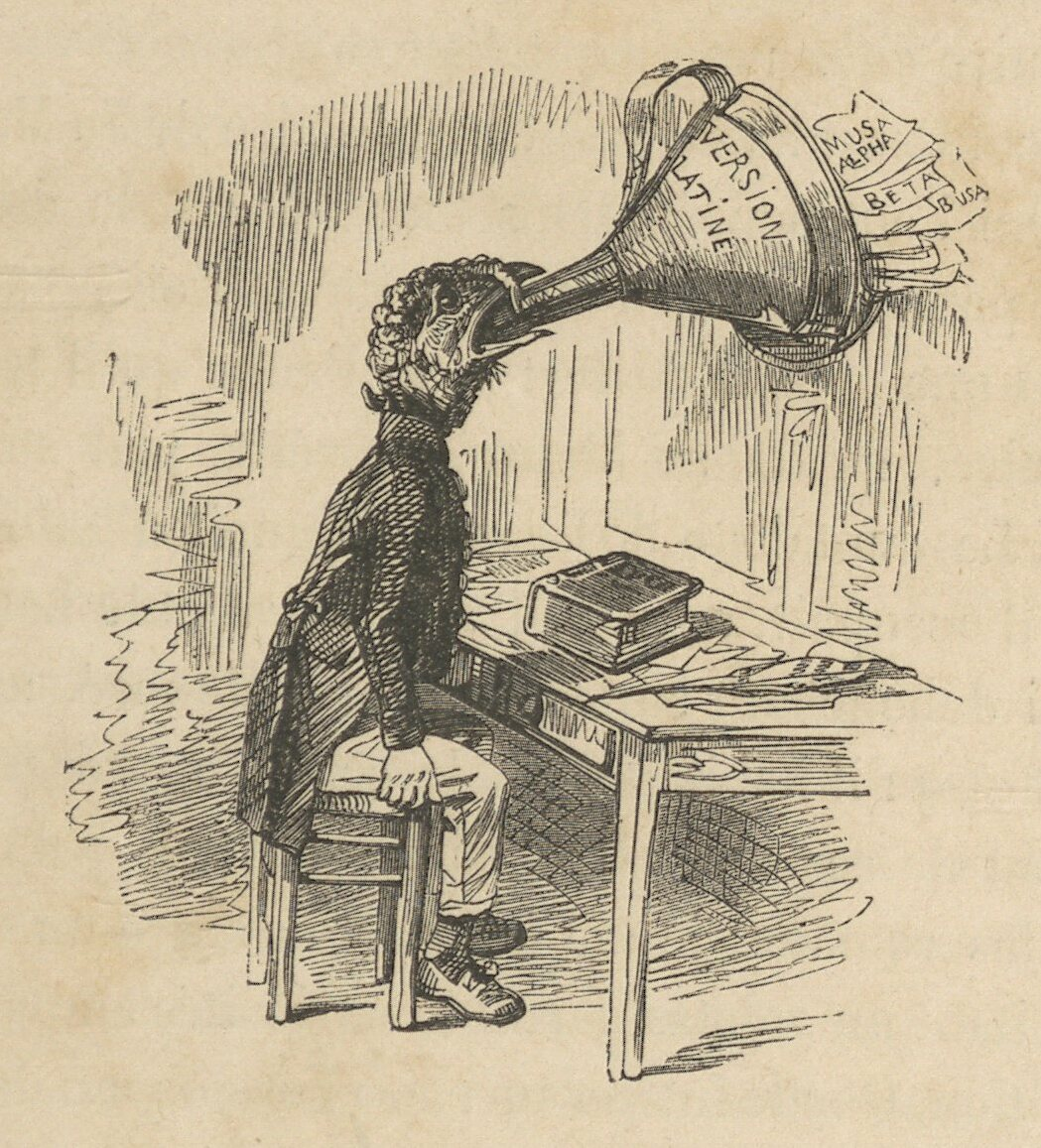
A Strange Funnel

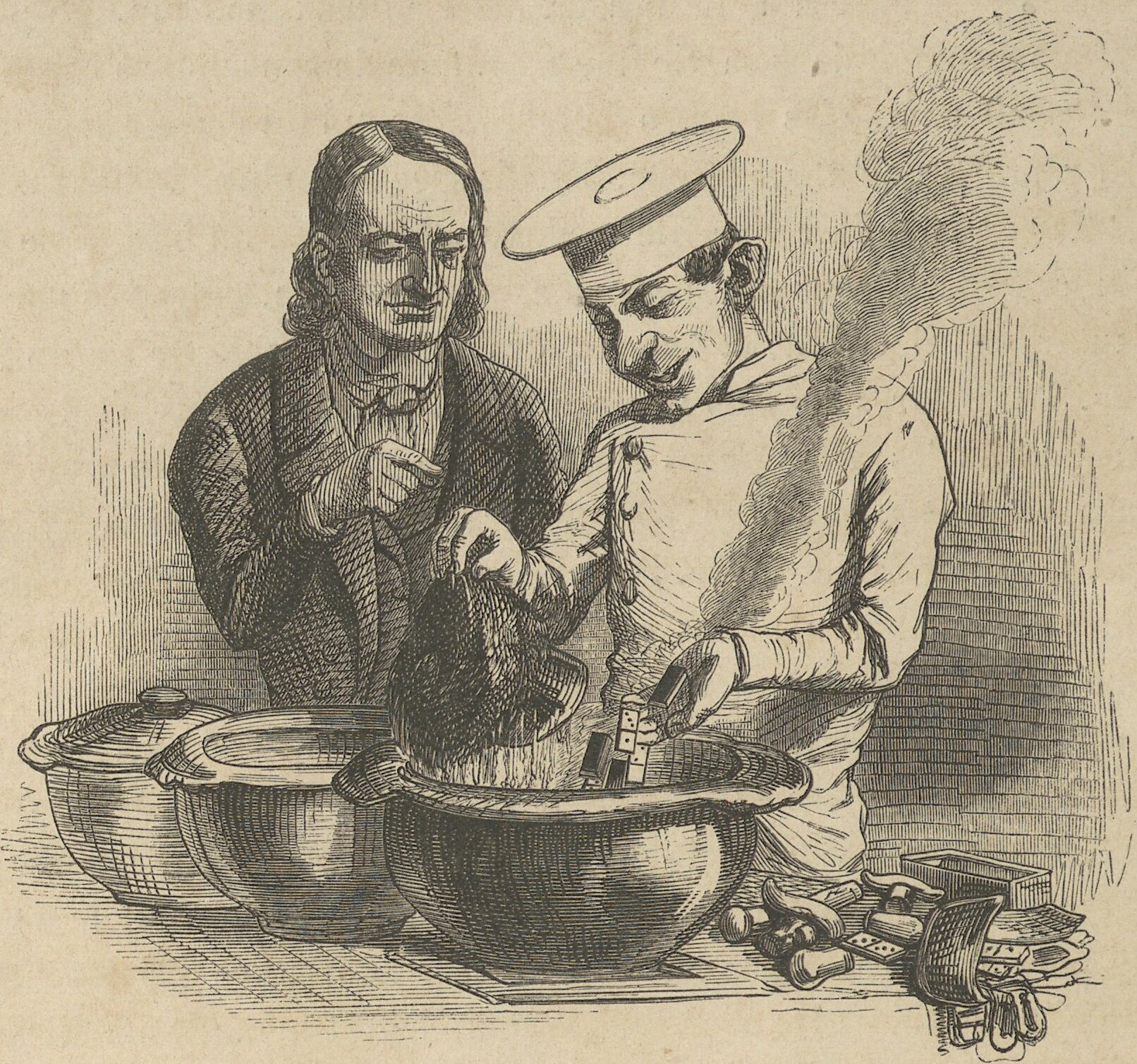
The genius cooks

== Selected works ==
- Les Métamorphoses du jour (Metamorphoses of the Day), 73 lithographs, Aubert, Paris, 1829
- Voyage pour l'éternité (Voyage to Eternity), 9 lithographs, Aubert, Paris, 1830
- La Silhouette (The Silhouette), 9 lithographs, periodical illustrations, 1829–1831
- La Caricature (The Caricature), 120 lithographs, periodical illustrations, 1830–1835
- Le Charivari (Le Charivari), 106 lithographs, periodical illustrations, 1832–1835
- L'Association Mensuelle lithographique (The Association of Monthly Lithographs), 16 lithographs, 1 etching, 1 engraving, periodical illustrations, 1832–1834
- Le Magasin pittoresque (The Picturesque Store), 67 woodcuts, periodical illustrations, 1833–1857
- 24 breuvages de l'homme (24 Beverages of Man), 8 lithographs, Bulla, Paris, 1835
- Oeuvres complétes de P. de Beranger (Complete works of P. de Béranger), 38 wood engravings, Fournier et Perrotin, Paris, 1835 (100 wood engravings in 1837 edition)
- Fables de La Fontaine (La Fontaine 's Fables), 258 wood engravings, Fournier et Perrotin, Paris, 1838–1840
- Voyages de Gulliver (Gulliver's Travels), by Jonathan Swift, 346 wood engravings, Fournier et Furne, Paris, 1838
- Les Aventures de Robinson Crusoe (The Adventures of Robinson Crusoe), by Daniel Defoe, 206 wood engravings, Fournier, Paris, 1840
- Les Français peints par eux-mêmes (The French Painted by Themselves), periodical illustrations, 18 wood engravings, 1840
- Fables de Lavalette (Fables of Lavalette), 21 etchings, Paulin et Hetzel, Paris, 1841 (33 etchings in 1847 ed.)
- Fables de Florian (Fables of Florian), 95 wood engravings, Dubochet, Paris, 1842
- Scènes de la vie privée et publique des animaux (Scenes of the Private and Public Life of Animals), 320 wood engravings, Hetzel et Paulin, Paris, 1842
- Petites misères de la vie humaine (Little Miseries of Human Life), by Old Nick & Grandville, 222 wood engravings, Fournier, Paris, 1843
- L'Illustration (The Illustration), 17 wood engravings, periodical illustrations, 1843–1845
- Un autre monde (Another World), text by Taxile Delord, 185 wood engravings, Fournier, Paris, 1844.
- Cent proverbes: par trois Tetes dans un bonnet (One Hundred Proverbs: by Three Heads in a Bonnet), by Old Nick, Taxile Delord, & Amédée Achard, 105 wood engravings, Fournier, Paris, 1845
- Jérôme Paturot à la recherche d'une position sociale (Jérôme Paturot in Search of a Social Position), by Louis Reybaud, 186 wood engravings, Dubochet, Paris, 1846
- Les fleurs animées (Animated Flowers or Flowers Personified), text by Taxile Delord, 2 wood engravings, 50 engravings, Gabriel de Gonet, Paris 1846
- L'Ingénieux hidalgo Don Quichotte de La Mancha (The Ingenious Gentleman Don Quixote of La Mancha), by Cervantes, 18 wood engravings, 8 engravings, Ad Mame et Cie, Tours, 1848
