= French corvette Créole =

French Navy warship

Créole
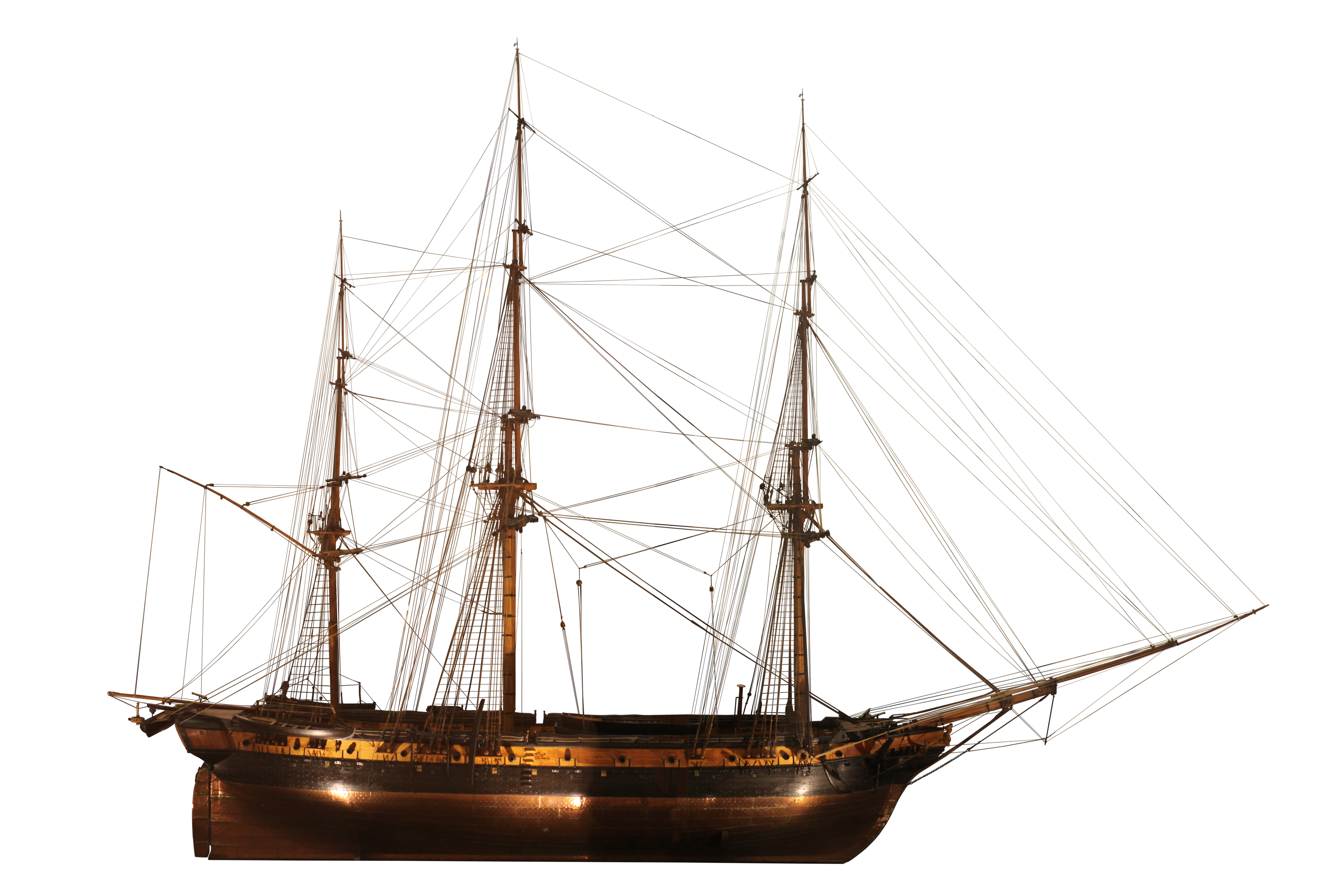
- 1/40th scale model of Créole, on display at the Musée national de la Marine in Paris

History

France
- Name: Créole
- Namesake: Creole peoples
- Builder: Cherbourg
- Laid down: August 1827
- Launched: 5 May 1829
- Commissioned: 1 January 1830
- Stricken: 29 December 1845

General characteristics
- Class & type: Créole-class corvette
- Displacement: 751 tonnes
- Length: 39 m (128 ft)
- Beam: 9.70 m (31.8 ft)
- Complement: 150 men
- Armament: 20 30-pounder carronades; 4 18-pounder long guns

Créole was a 24-gun Créole-class corvette of the French Navy.

== Career ==
She took part in the Pastry War under lieutenant commander de Joinville, and most notably in the Bombardment of San Juan de Ulloa.

On 20 January 1844, Créole was driven ashore on Negropont, Greece. She was refloated on 27 January with assistance from HMS Vesuvius and taken in to Piraeus, Greece, where she sank. She was later refloated.

== Model ==
A finely crafted shipyard model is on display at the Musée national de la Marine in Paris. It was originally stored in the office of the prince de Joinville.

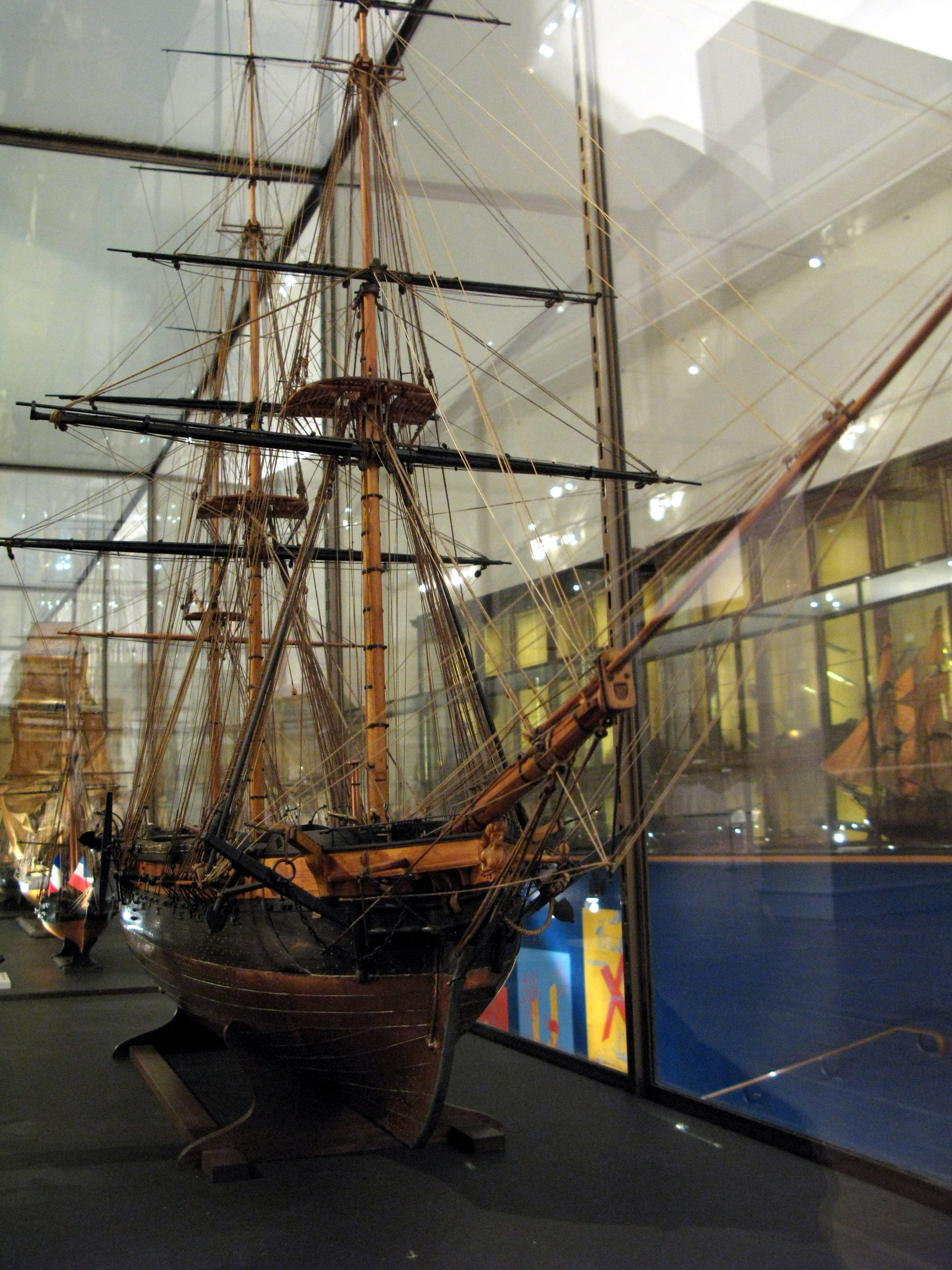

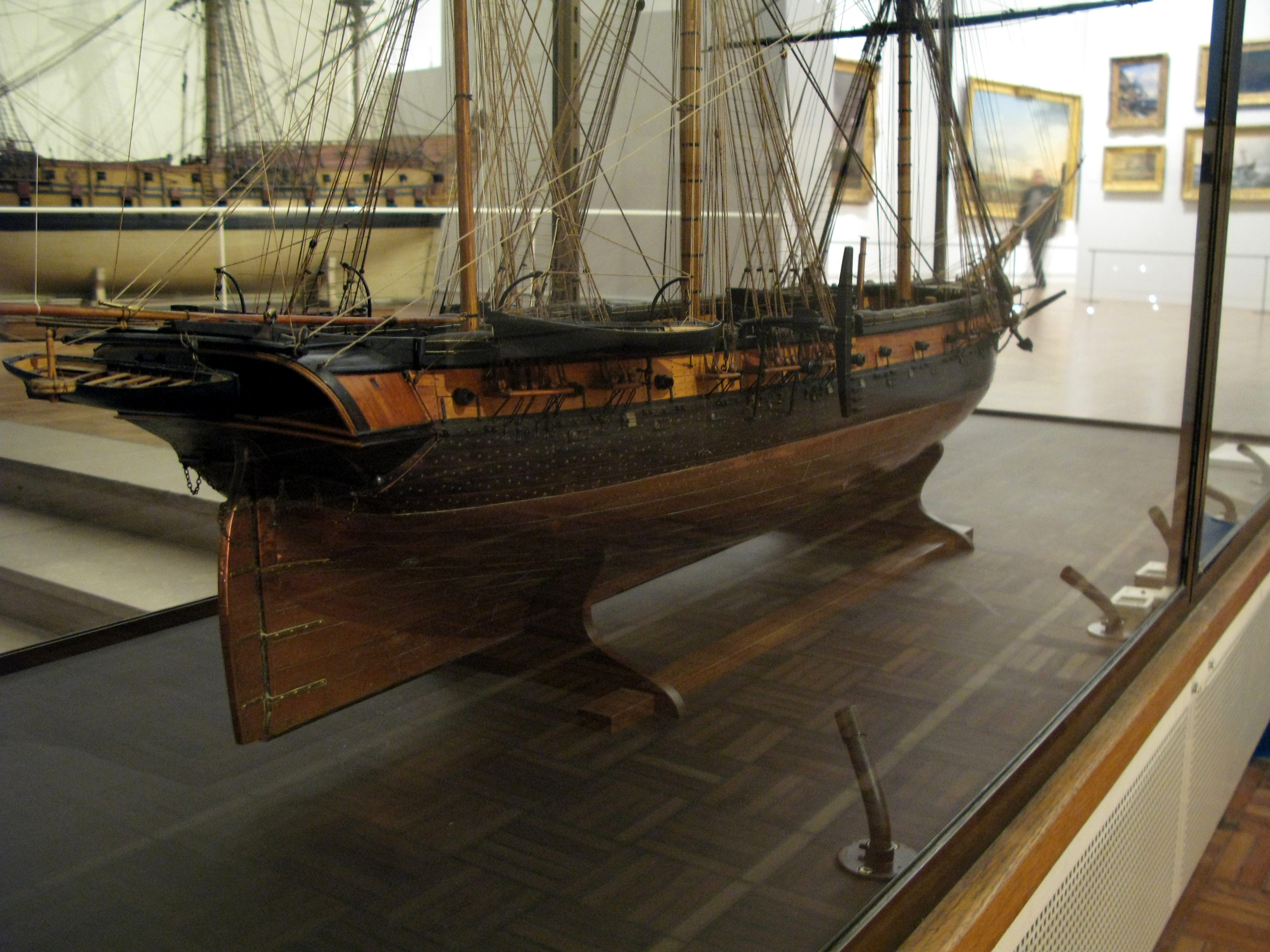

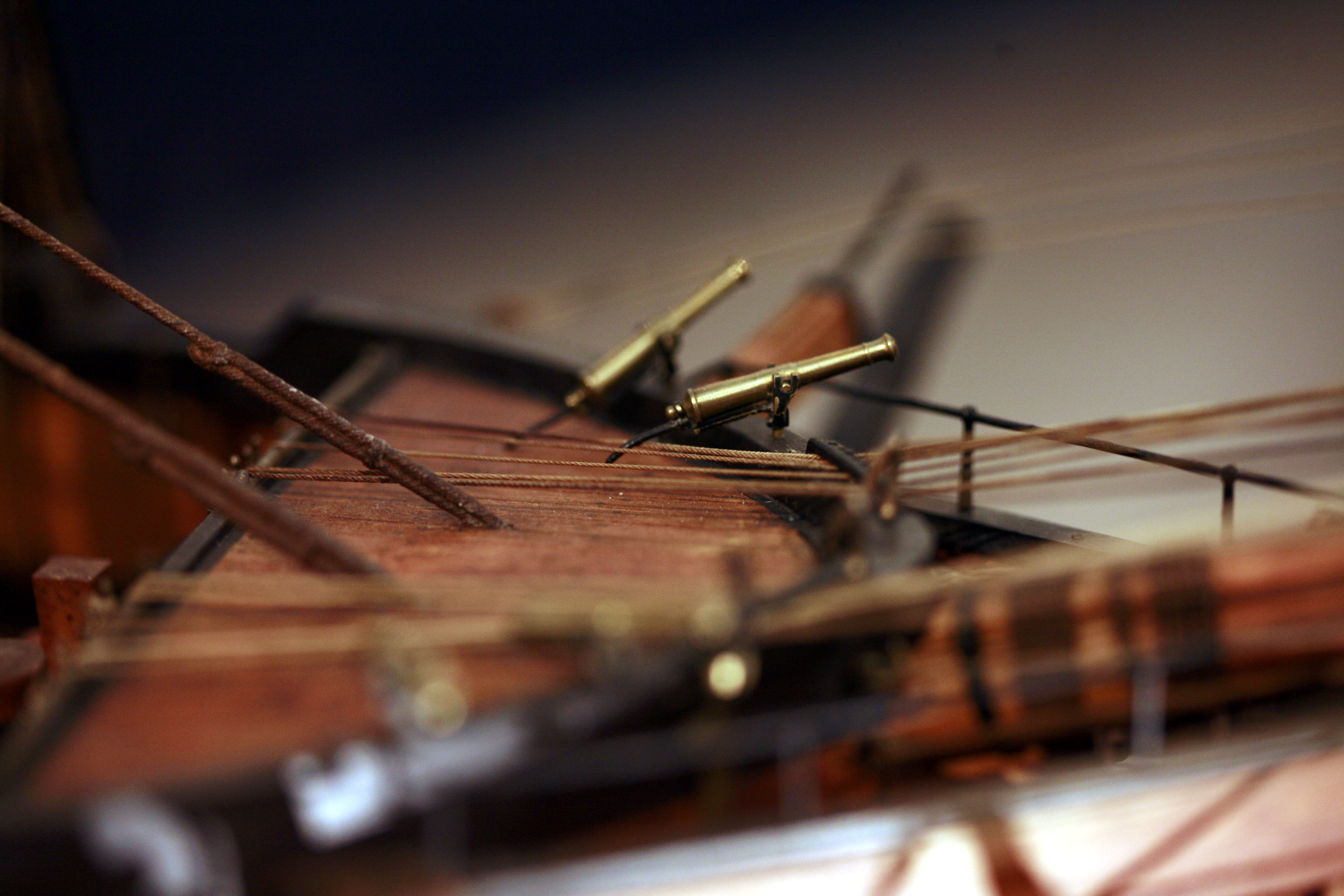

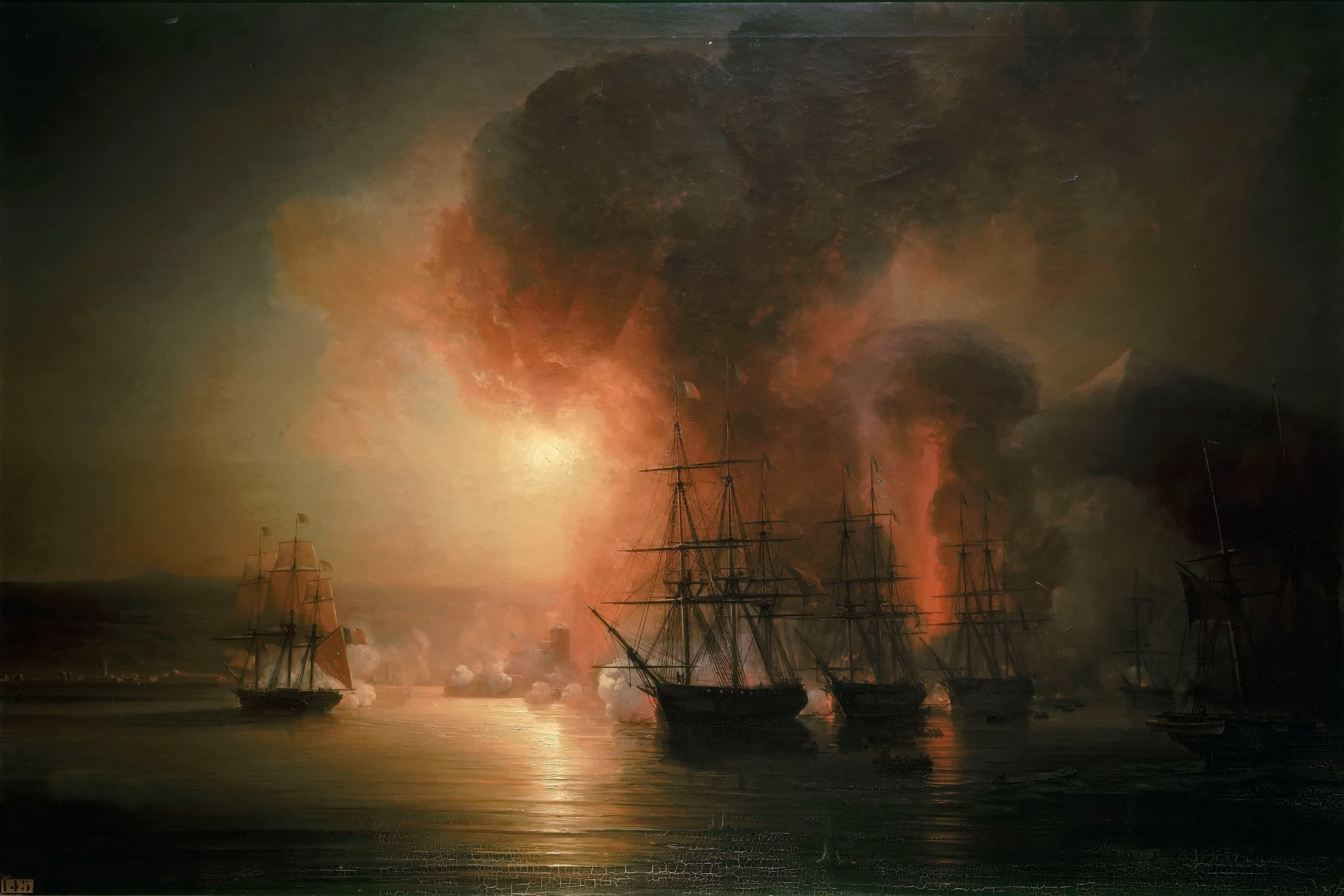
Bombardment of San Juan de Ulúa off Vera Cruz. From left to right, the corvette Créole, and the frigates Gloire, Néréide and Iphigénie.
