= French frigate Iphigénie (1827) =

Frigate of the French Navy

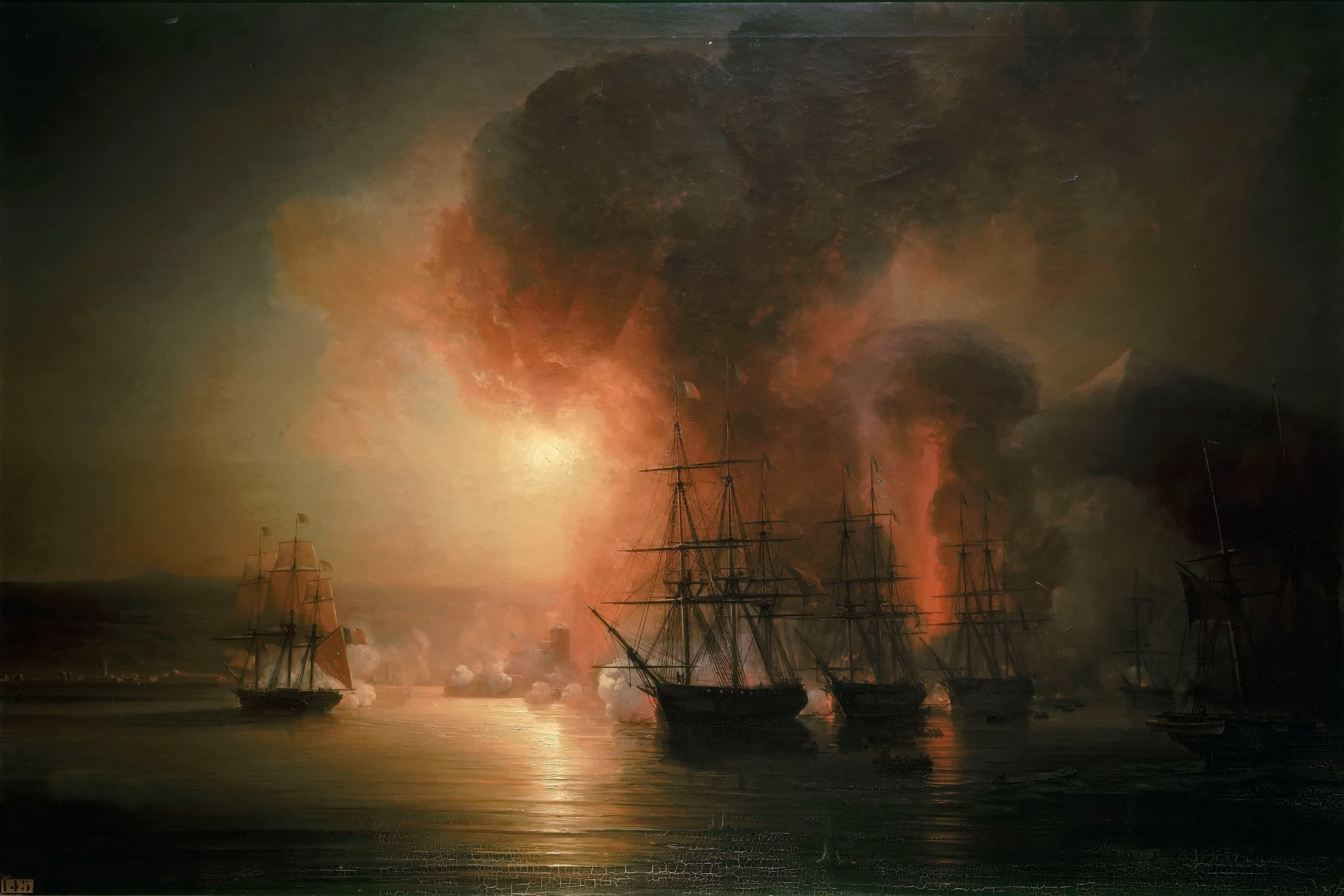
- Bombardment of San Juan de Ulúa off Vera Cruz. From left to right, the corvette Créole, and the frigates Gloire, Néréide and Iphigénie.

History

France
- Name: Iphigénie
- Builder: Toulon
- Laid down: August 1824
- Launched: 3 May 1827
- Commissioned: 27 September 1827
- Decommissioned: 1891
- Fate: Broken up in 1900

General characteristics
- Type: frigate
- Tonnage: 2676 tonnes
- Length: 53.92 m (176.9 ft)
- Beam: 14.14 m (46.4 ft)
- Propulsion: Sails
- Complement: 513 men
- Armament: 60 guns : 30 30-pounders; 28 28-pounders; 2 carronades

Iphigénie was a first rank frigate of the French Navy. Launched in Toulon in 1827, she took part in the Battle of Veracruz, and was eventually broken up in 1900.

== Career ==
Launched in Toulon on 3 May 1827, Iphigénie was commissioned on 27 September.

In 1838, under Captain Alexandre Ferdinand Parseval-Deschenes, she was part of a frigate squadron under Charles Baudin and took part in the Battle of Veracruz, where she was the third ship in the French line of battle.

Between 1844 and 1850, Iphigénie was used as a schoolship in Toulon. She was decommissioned on 1 July 1872 and used as a mooring hulk.

Renamed to Druide in 1877, she was struck in 1891, and broken up in 1900.
