= Invasion of Mexico =

Invasion of Mexico may refer to:

- the Mexican–American War, an invasion of Mexico by the United States Army from 1846 to 1848
- United States occupation of Veracruz, occupation of Veracruz by the United States Army in 1914
- the Pastry War, a war between the Kingdom of France and the Mexican Republic from 1838 to 1839
- Second French intervention in Mexico, military invasion of the Republic of Mexico by the French Empire of Napoleon III
