= Battle of Veracruz (1838) =

Part of the Pastry War

Coordinates: 19.2092°N 96.1314°W

- Part of the Pastry War
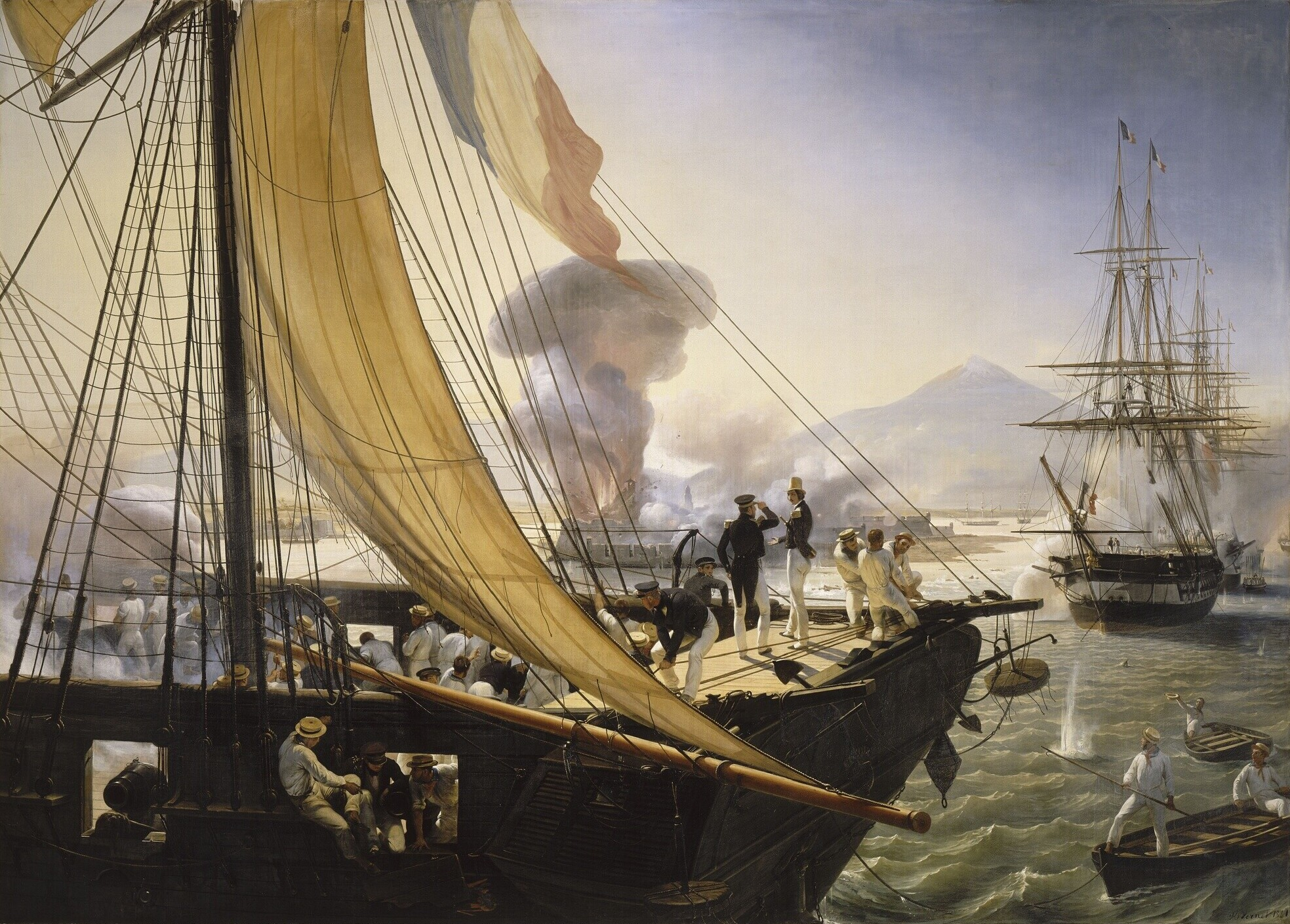
- 1841 painting of the battle
Date	27 November – 5 December 1838
Location	Veracruz, Mexico
Result	French victory
Territorial changes	Veracruz briefly taken by France

Belligerents
France	Mexico

Commanders and leaders
Charles Baudin; François d'Orléans	Santa Anna (WIA); Mariano Arista (POW); Antonio Gaona; Manuel Rincon

Strength
3,000; 4 frigates 2 corvettes 8 brigs 2 bomb ketches	3,229; 1 fort

The Battle of Veracruz, also known as the Battle of San Juan de Ulúa, was a naval engagement that pitted a French frigate squadron under Rear Admiral Charles Baudin against the Mexican citadel of San Juan de Ulúa, which defended the city of Veracruz, from 27 November to 5 December 1838.

Having crossed the Atlantic to settle a dispute between France and Mexico, the squadron anchored off Veracruz and negotiated until all diplomatic means to resolve the dispute appeared exhausted. After announcing that hostilities would begin, Baudin had his squadron bombard the fort. French fire, particularly heavy mortars mounted on bomb vessels and Paixhans guns on frigates, silenced the citadel and forced it to surrender on 28 November, a remarkable feat for the time. Mexican authorities, however, refused to cave in to French demands, forcing Baudin to mount a raid against the city itself on 5 December. Despite its limited ground forces, the French squadron succeeded in capturing General Mariano Arista and in wounding General Antonio López de Santa Anna.

The swift capture of the citadel by a small squadron of relatively light warships stunned military observers who had gathered to watch the scene, and marked the beginning of the era of shell artillery and the modernization of navies around the world. Politically, the attack undermined the Mexican regime while bolstering the prestige of Santa Anna, contributing to the political instability of Mexico. In France the battle attracted considerable public attention at the moment, but was later overshadowed by the much more considerable French intervention in Mexico in the 1860s.

== Background ==
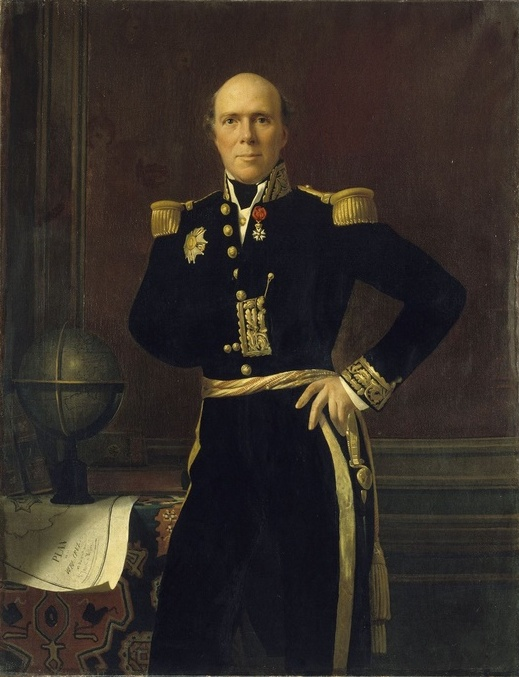
An engraving of the French admiral Charles Baudin, by an unknown author.

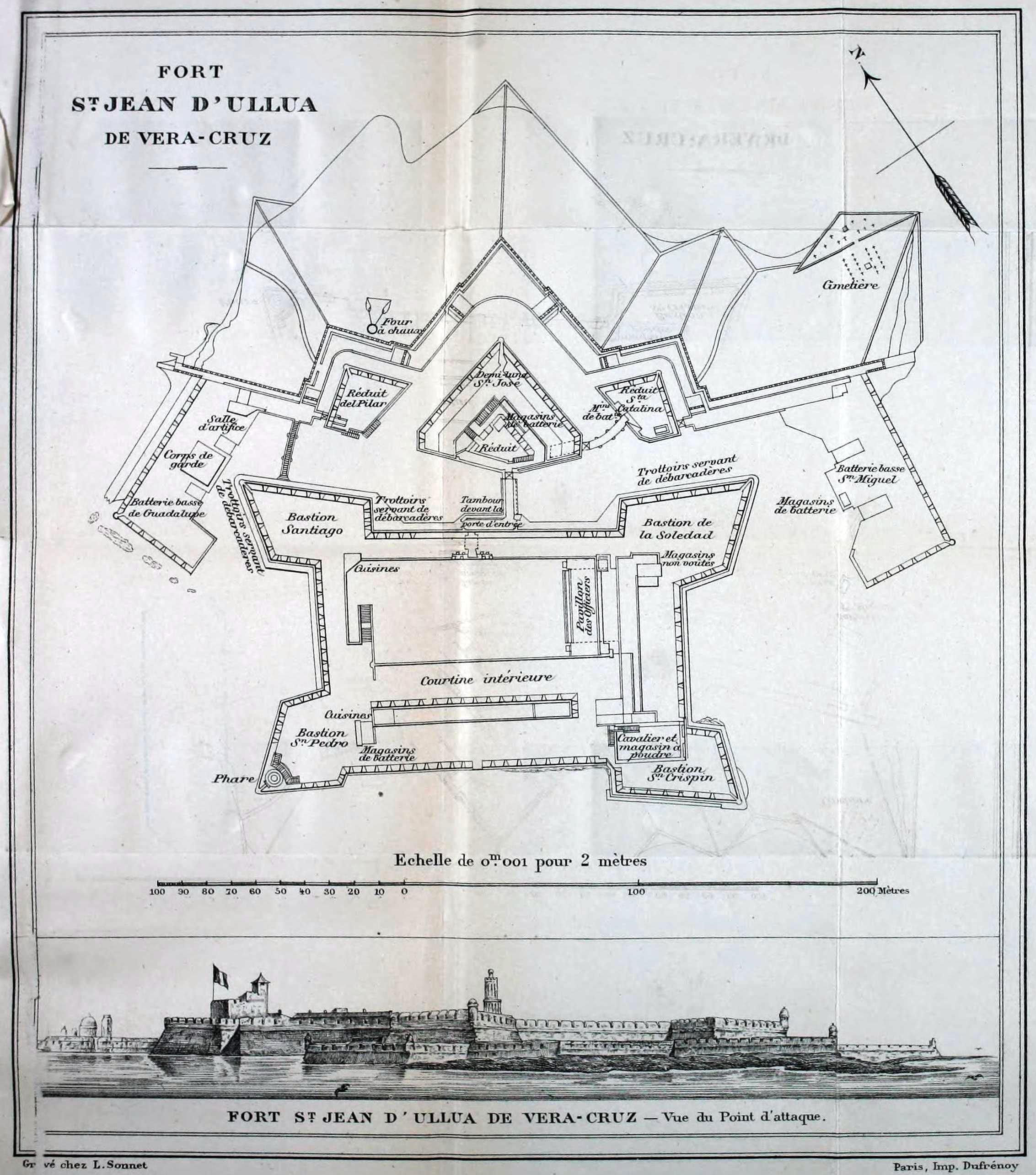
Layout of the fort of San Juan de Ulúa in 1838.

The Mexican War of Independence concluded with Mexico gaining independence from the Spanish Empire, and the rise of many different factions attempting to seize power. Several generals took power through force of arms, resulting in 20 different Presidents of Mexico in 20 years. Civilian populations suffered from these struggles for power, as well as foreign expatriates, as the country had attracted considerable investments, notably in the mining industry. In particular, the 6000 French that had settled in Mexico periodically requested intervention on their behalf from the French government, and their allies were becoming more numerous and urgent. Between 1828–38 a rash of killings, expropriations, forced borrowings, arbitrary arrests and other abuses were committed. The French government made several attempts at settling the matter by commercial agreements, demands for compensations and even threats of armed interventions, but to no avail.

In 1837 a French pastry cook named Remontel, established in Tacubaya, had his stocks pillaged by drunken Mexican soldiers. The French government decided to settle the matter once and for all by sending a military expedition to Mexico, tasked with demanding punishment for the culprits, guarantees for the security of French interests in the future, to demand that French citizens in the country be exempted from forced war contributions and borrowings and the payment of 600,000 Piastres, equivalent to 3,000,000 francs. The Mexican government refused, and because of the triggering incident, the conflict has become known as the "Pastry War". A first French frigate squadron under Captain Charles Louis Joseph Bazoche, comprising the 60-gun frigate Herminie and three brigs, was sent to Mexico in late 1837 in order to demonstrate French resolve and anchored off Veracruz. As Mexico did not possess any warship capable of challenging the squadron, the frigates blockaded the city unopposed, seizing 36 merchantmen in the process, but President Anastasio Bustamante refused to satisfy the demands. On 16 April 1838 diplomatic relations between France and Mexico broke down, leaving military action as a last recourse. However, the fortress of San Juan de Ulua was much too strong for Bazoche's forces, who were further exhausted by months of campaigning and suffered from yellow fever.

A stronger second squadron, under Charles Baudin, was sent later that year. The backbone of this squadron was provided by four powerful frigates: the 60-gun Iphigénie, the 50-gun Néréide, Gloire and Médée; Bazoche's Herminie was supposed to reinforce the squadron, but she was wrecked in Bermuda. Frigates were chosen because they were deemed strong enough to carry out a serious military mission but were sufficiently light to avoid causing tensions with Britain. The squadron also comprised the 24-gun corvettes Créole and Naïade; the brigs Alcibiade, Lapérouse, Voltigeur, Cuirassier, Eclipse, Dupetit-Thouars, Dunois and Zèbre (a ninth brig, the ten-gun Laurier, had to reroute to Havana after sustaining damage in a storm), and two bomb ketches, Vulcain and Cyclope. Furthermore, the squadron had two steamers, Météore and Phaéton, to facilitate maneuvers in the harbor, and two corvettes armed en flûte, Fortune and Caravane, for logistics. Baudin had his flag on Néréide. The squadron sported 380 guns, some of them heavy mortars mounted on the bomb ketches and newly introduced Paixhans guns on the frigates. It also transported three artillery companies and one engineering company, but no naval infantry. With the nearest French stations in Martinique and Guadeloupe, at the other end of the Gulf of Mexico, the squadron had to use Havana as a base, and thus made itself dependent on the good will of Spanish authorities.

The bulk of the squadron left Toulon in the summer of 1838, stopping in Cádiz to rendezvous with the ships inbound from Brest, and sailed for the Caribbean. A storm partially scattered the fleet en route, whose main forces reached Veracruz on 29 October, to be rejoined by later ships around mid-November. The city of Veracruz was defended by the fort of San Juan de Ulúa, located about a kilometre from the city and protected by a reef. It had 103 bronze and 83 iron cannon and an effective strength of four to five hundred men.

== Battle ==
=== Bombing and capture of San Juan de Ulua ===
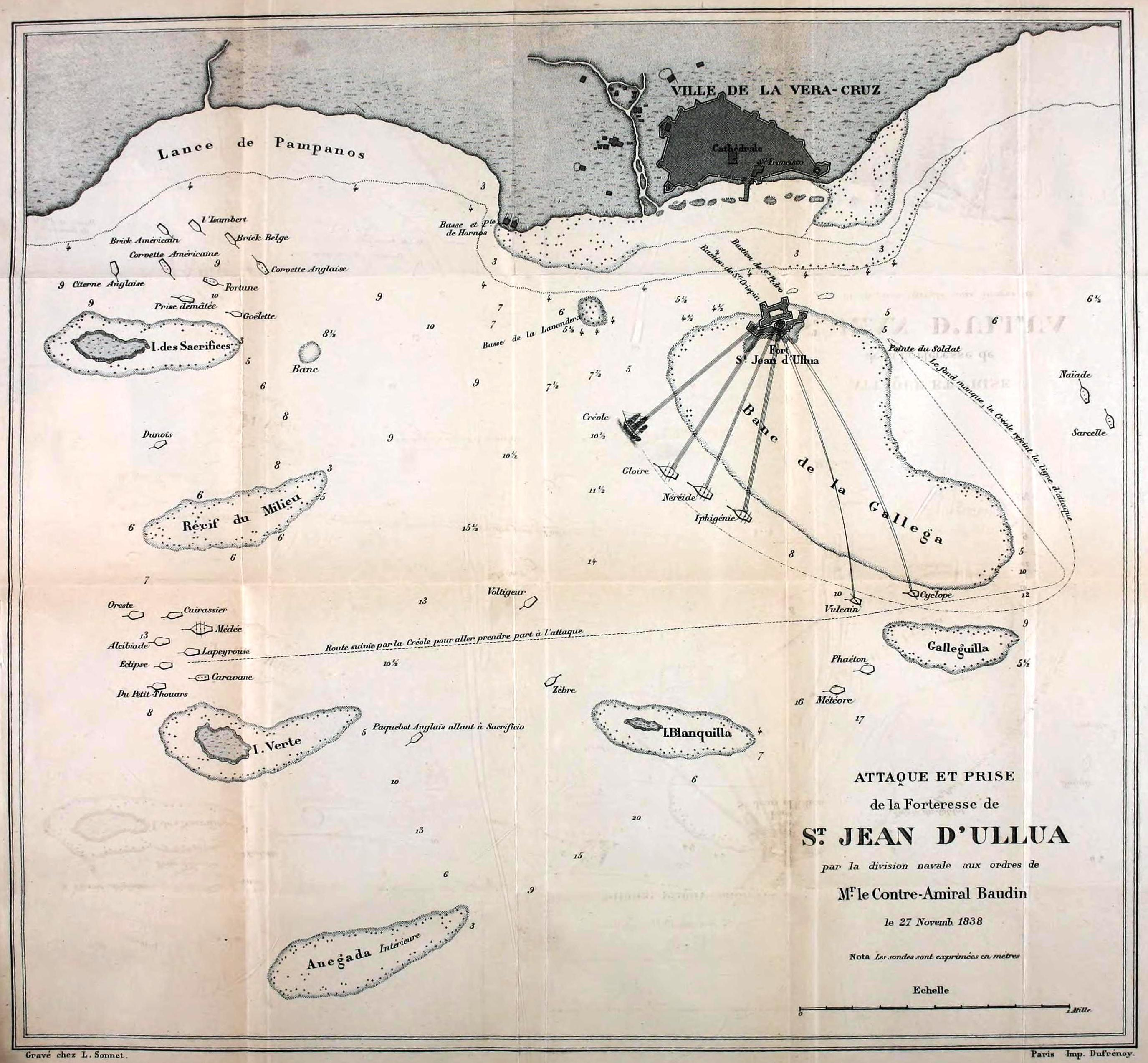
Positions of the ships during the bombardment.

After his arrival, Baudin opened negotiations with Bustamante's government, but to no avail. The French blockade did hinder the Mexican economy, but it did not have a crucial impact, as the country was largely self-sufficient and other needed goods could be imported from Corpus Christi harbor, in Texas, and across the Rio Bravo. The Mexicans were in fact trying to wear down Baudin's forces until the blockade would have to be lifted to replenish the ships and rest the crews. The French, on the other hand, were taking the opportunity to reconnoiter the coast, measure the depth of water and observe the Mexican forces; they had noticed that the artillery of the fort was in a state of disrepair and a naval bombardment could be carried out. Eventually Baudin issued an ultimatum for 27 November at noon, and readied for combat. In the afternoon of 26 November the French formed a line of battle with the frigates Gloire, Néréide and Iphigénie, two of them helped by the steamers. In the morning of the 27th the two bomb ketches were towed behind the frigates, close to the reef. The corvette Créole stayed off the scene as an observer, while the other ships anchored near Blanquila island. A number of neutral ships, including several naval ships from nations not party to the conflict but interested in its outcome, anchored off the scene to observe the events. The maneuvers were observed by the Mexicans, who sent two officers over to further negotiate. At 14:00 Baudin sent them back with a message for General Manuel Rincón, the Mexican commander: "I have lost all hopes to obtain through pacific means the honorable settlement that I was in charge of proposing to the Mexican cabinet: I find myself in the necessity to open hostilities".

At 14:30 the three frigates opened fire, followed by the two bomb ketches. Baudin later stated:

Never before had I seen a more nourished and well-directed fire. I had no other worry than to moderate its ardour. From time to time, I signaled a cease-fire to let the smoke that hid the fortress dissipate: we then corrected the pointing and fire would begin again with a renewed vivacity.

Around 15:30 the Créole, having cruised off the fort by the north, requested authorization to join the fight, which was granted. She positioned herself in front of the frigates and started a well-directed fire, which Joinville commanded from the poop deck. At some point cannon fire from the fort penetrated the prince's cabin and shattered his dish; Joinville then took off his hat and saluted the Mexicans.

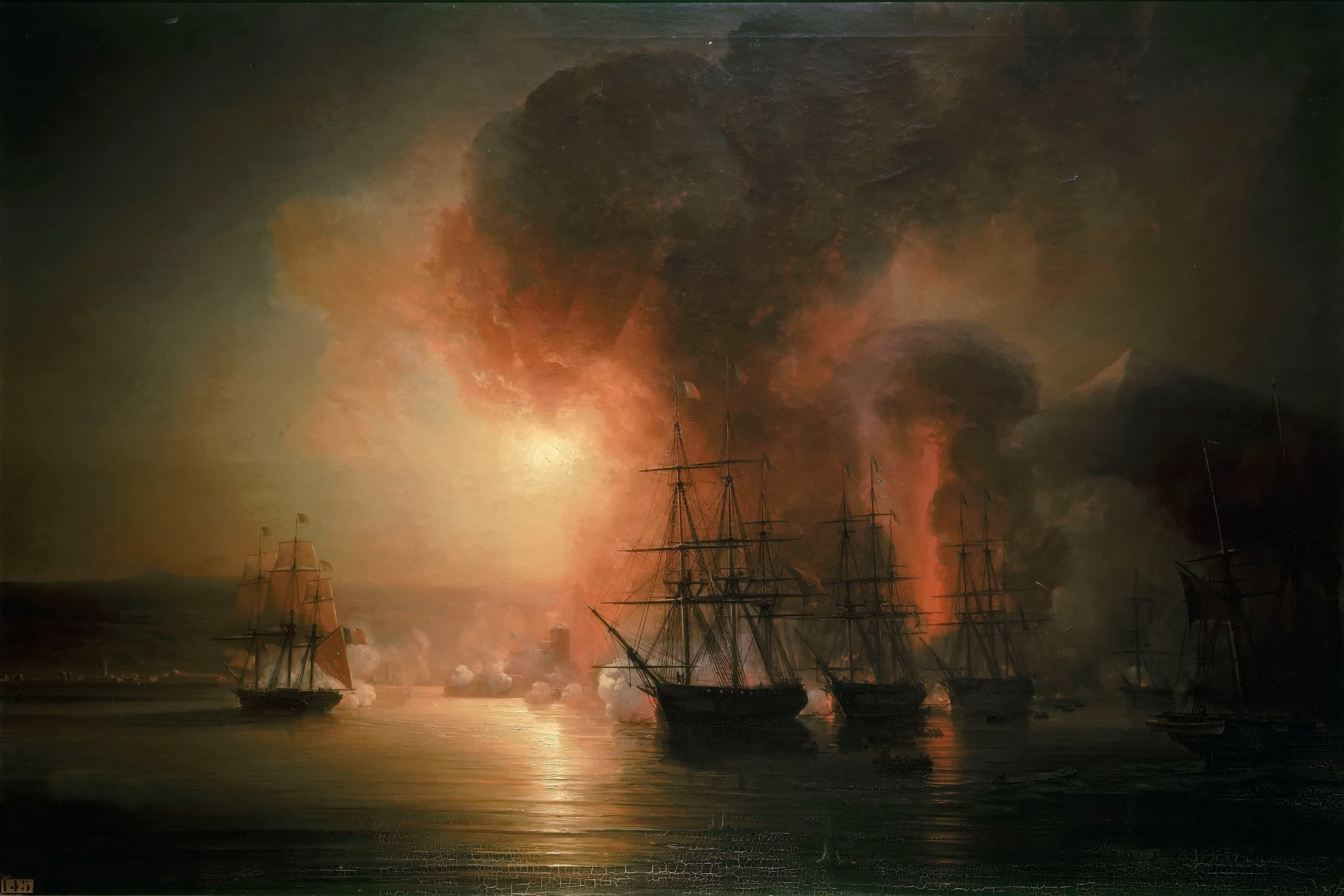
1839 painting of the bombardment of San Juan de Ulua by Théodore Gudin

Soon afterwards, two powder depots were hit and exploded; they were followed by the signaling tower of the fort, which exploded in an impressive mushroom cloud of smoke and debris, later represented in many depictions of the battle. A fourth explosion occurred around 17:10. Fire from the Mexican batteries then greatly diminished. Baudin ordered Gloire and Iphigénie to retreat, and they were taken away in tow by the steamers; the flagship Néréide remained along with the bomb ketches. At sunset only a few of the French guns were still firing, and Baudin ordered a cease-fire at 20:00 to save ammunition.

At 20:30 a Mexican boat sailed to the French squadron to parley and request a suspension of hostilities so that the fort could request orders from Rincón. Baudin granted a truce until the 28th at 2:00 in the morning, and personally wrote a letter, threatening to annihilate the fortress and offering an "honorable capitulation". The defenders had lost over 220 killed already, and had expended almost all the ammunition not destroyed in the explosion of the powder depot. One of the upper batteries was entirely destroyed, and most of the outer defenses were demolished. At 3:00 the governor had still not answered; Baudin then threatened to bombard the city itself if the fort did not surrender immediately. In the early hours of the morning, Rincón caved and signed the capitulation of the fort and of the city. Commanding Gen. Antonio Gaona surrendered the fort to the French that day; the three artillery companies landed and took position there. Baudin accepted that 1000 Mexican soldiers stay in Vera Cruz, as the French did not have sufficient troops to formally occupy the city. The ships then retreated from the reef, as the strengthening sea rendered the anchorage dangerous. French casualties were four killed and 29 wounded.

=== Raid on Veracruz ===
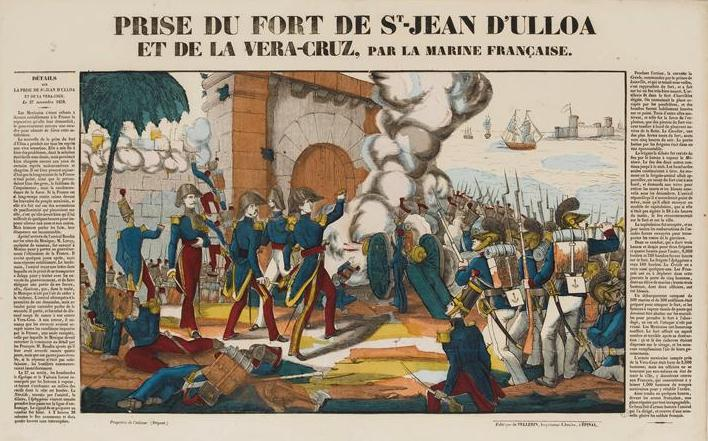
Details on the taking of St-JEAN ULLOA and VERA CRUZ, illustrated by an unknown author.

The capture of San Juan de Ulua came as a surprise to the Mexican government, which declared war on France, expelled all French citizens established in Mexico, relieved Rincón of command and sent an army of 3200 men, under Santa Anna and Arista, to retake Veracruz. This army reached the city in short order, prompting French residents to flee to the fortress. Baudin, who expected negotiations to start again, found himself with further military operations to perform. Baudin decided to answer the challenge by a raid on Veracruz. In addition to the garrison and the newly arrived forces, the city was protected by a belt of fortifications; it was, however, a small city, and its layout was well known to the French. Baudin thus decided to attempt a swift surprise strike to disarm the forts and kidnap Santa Anna. To strengthen the sparse forces available, the soldiers of the artillery and engineering were reinforced by sailors from the crews of the ships. On 5 December, at 5:00 in the morning, boats from the squadron landed 1500 men on the beaches before Veracruz; they split into three columns: two wings ascended the city walls near the strongholds of Santiago and Conception. The Mexicans were taken by surprise, so much so that no shots were fired. The two groups sabotaged the cannons and ran on the wall to reach the opposite side of the city.

The central column, under François de Joinville, was tasked with blowing up the door commanding access to the harbor, storming the city and attacking the buildings where the Mexican generals were thought to be staying. This largely succeeded, as the door was destroyed as planned and the column reached the Mexican headquarters almost unopposed; however, Mexican soldiers began to put up a resistance and Santa Anna managed to escape, although Arista was captured. The French retreated with their prisoner, fighting on the way with a unit of Mexican troops stationed in a monastery being used as barracks. Baudin, who had disembarked, declared the mission accomplished and ordered his men to re-embark. The two wing columns retreated without difficulties, but as the central column completed its reembarkment, it was hit by a counterattack led by Santa Anna. The French opened fire with captured cannons and with the light carronades of the boats, firing grapeshot that killed and maimed the Mexicans; Santa Anna himself had his horse killed under him and was severely wounded. The French had sustained eight killed and 56 wounded, mostly from friendly fire in the confusion of the Mexican counterattack; the Mexicans suffered 31 killed and 26 wounded, according to the account of Santa Anna. Five bullet impacts were found on Baudin's own boat.

== Aftermath ==
The double defeat in San Juan de Ulua and Veracruz itself induced the Mexican government to reopen negotiations to settle the conflict, especially since the French had not increased their demands as their position grew stronger. The Mexican Army evacuated Veracruz, but it remained under the authority of the Bustamante government, while the French Army remained stationed in the fort. The British offered their mediation to ease the process, dispatching their Northern American squadron in the Gulf of Mexico, along with Ambassador Richard Pakenham with a fleet. The peace treaty was eventually signed on 9 March 1839, whereby the Mexican government relented. The 600,000 pesos were paid and French residents of Mexico enjoyed better protection. The squadron returned to Brest on 15 August 1839, after losing 24 men to yellow fever. Baudin was promoted to Vice-Admiral.

The fall of San Juan de Ulua came as a surprise to the world. Neutral observers, notably from HMS Satellite, under Captain Robb, and USS Levant, reported the effect of the French bombardment. Lord Wellington is often reported to have stated in the House that the incident was the only recorded example of a strong fort overwhelmed entirely by a naval squadron. (Note: Which was inexact, as instances of forts reduced to silence by naval forces were recorded in the 18th century.) The French success was in part due to the use of newly introduced Paixhans guns, even though the frigates had fired 7771 round shots and only 177 Paixhans shells; the bomb ketches had themselves fired 302 mortar bombs, and were credited with the destruction of the Mexican ammunition depots. The American observer, Admiral David Farragut, reported the effects of the shells in the fort. The fight also served as a confirmation to the usefulness of steamers to assist traditional warships in their maneuvers. Even though they were fitted only with 100-hp engines and paddles, they had efficiently positioned the frigates to their optimum firing positions. The French Navy had already used a steamer in this role during the invasion of Algiers in 1830.

In Mexico the war shook the political landscape. Santa Anna, who previously had been discredited by the Texas Revolution, was hailed as a hero for his ultimately failed attempt at a counterattack; severely wounded, he had a leg amputated on 6 December and battled death for days. His narration of the battle made him very popular, to the point that his leg was buried in Mexico with full military honors. Santa Anna seized power on 20 March 1839 in a coup d'État, furthering the political instability that had been the cause of the conflict. In France the expedition elevated two officers to prominence: Baudin, an elderly veteran of the Napoleonic era; and the 20-year-old Prince of Joinville, third son of the ruling Louis-Philippe, who had commanded the Créole during the bombardment and the main column during the raid. Joinville became a hero, and used his prestige to promote technical innovations like steam power. He was promoted to capitaine de vaisseau and to Knight in the Order of the Legion of Honor. The tactics used by the French squadron, and its use of steam power and shell artillery, were a prelude of the events of the Crimean War.

== Bibliography ==
- Mullié, Charles (1852). "Baudin (Charles)" . Biographie des célébrités militaires des armées de terre et de mer de 1789 à 1850 (in French). Paris: Poignavant et Compagnie.
- (in Spanish) Vicente Riva Palacio - México a través de los siglos - Mexico
- Henry B. Parkes _ Histoire du Mexique PAYOT - Paris
- (in French) Jacques Penot, L'expansion commerciale française au Mexique et les causes du conflit franco-mexicain de 1838-1839, Bulletin Hispanique, 1973
