= French frigate Médée (1811) =

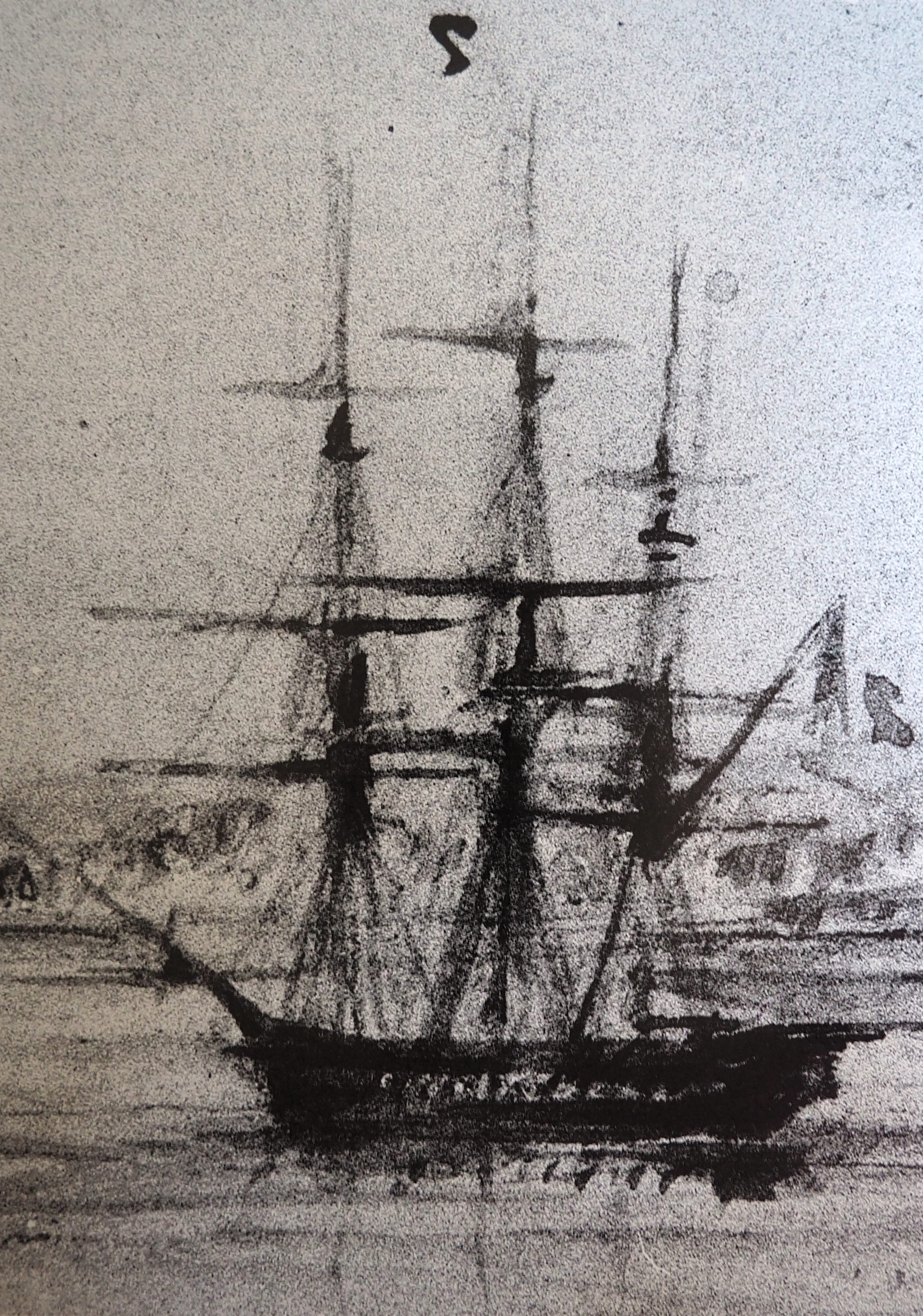
- Médée anchored at Vera-Cruz in 1838. Drawing by Admiral Théodore Constant Leray.

History

France
- Name: Médée
- Namesake: Medea
- Builder: Genoa, Italy
- Laid down: 1810
- Launched: 5 May 1811
- Decommissioned: 1883
- Fate: Sank 1883

General characteristics
- Class & type: Ariane-class frigate
- Length: 45.5 m (149 ft 3 in)
- Beam: 12.36 m (40 ft 7 in)
- Draught: 5.9 m (19 ft 4 in)
- Sail plan: Full-rigged ship, 1,950 m^{2} (21,000 sq ft)
- Complement: 325
- Armament: 46 guns: Battery: 28 × 18-pounder long guns; Quarterdeck and forecastle: 4 × 8-pounder long guns; 12 × 18-pounder carronades

Médée was a 46-gun frigate of the French Navy.

She took part in the Invasion of Algiers in 1830, and in the Battle of Veracruz in 1838.

In 1849, reconditioned as a hulk, she was renamed Muiron. She sank in 1883

== See also ==
- List of French sail frigates
