= USRC Woodbury (1837) =

History

United States
- Name: USRC Woodbury
- Namesake: Associate Justice Levi Woodbury
- Operator: United States Revenue Cutter Service; United States Coast Guard
- Port of registry: United States
- Builder: L. H. Duncan (Baltimore, Md)
- Cost: $11,250
- Laid down: 7 February 1837
- Launched: 27 March 1837
- Commissioned: 8 November 1836
- Decommissioned: 14 September 1846
- Out of service: 1 June 1847
- Home port: New Orleans, Louisiana
- Fate: Sold and broken up

General characteristics
- Tonnage: 120
- Sail plan: Topsail schooner
- Speed: unknown
- Complement: officers, 15 enlisted, 4 boys
- Armament: four 12-pounders and one 6-pounder

USRC Woodbury, also referred to as Levi Woodbury, the first marine cutter to bear the name, was a schooner-rigged revenue cutter built for the United States Revenue Cutter Service. Woodbury was authorized on 8 November 1836, and Revenue-Marine Captain H. D. Hunter was assigned to supervise construction. Woodbury was built at Baltimore, Md, by L. H. Duncan, and was launched on 27 March 1837. The cutter was a 120-ton topsail schooner mounted with four 12-pound and one 6-pound cannon.

After being made ready for sea. Woodbury set sail for New Orleans to relieve the revenue cutter Campbell in Gulf of Mexico patrols. By 28 March 1838, Woodbury was operating in the Gulf of Mexico in cooperation with the United States Navy. Orders from the Collector of Customs at New Orleans to the Woodbury commanding officer, "You will proceed to sea forthwith, taking your cruising ground from Chandalier Islands to the mouth of the Sabine River, and in the event of any vessel sailing under our flag, being in your presence unlawfully attacked, by an armed force, you will render such aid and protection as may be in your power." . The ship was damaged by a French warship and was allowed to go to Veracruz, Mexico, for repairs, was detained, and was there to witness the French bombardment of the fortress at San Juan de Ulua and the surrender. Released 29 November 1838, Woodbury sailed for New Orleans where she was refitted to resume patrolling the Gulf of Mexico. Ordered to Baltimore the Woodbury arrived there 26 August 1839, and after refitting departed for New Orleans 23 September 1839, for continued patrols also running dispatch during the war with Mexico. On Feb. 17, 1845, the Republic of Texas cutter Santa Anna ordered 2 schooners loading cotton to stop at Sabine Pass and pay tonnage fees and waited at the custom's house. When the schooners began sailing through the pass they were escorted by Woodbury and was allowed to pass without incident. On 2 March 1846, Woodbury arrived at Aransas Pass, Texas. Captain Winslow Foster placed his ship at the disposal of General Zachary Taylor and escorted transports moving troops to Point Isabel. After more than ten years of service, Woodbury was decommissioned on 14 September 1846 and sold on 1 June 1847.
