= San Juan de Ulúa =

Historic fortress off the coast of Veracruz, Mexico

Fortaleza de San Juan de Ulúa
- Fortress of San Juan de Ulúa
- Veracruz, Veracruz, Mexico
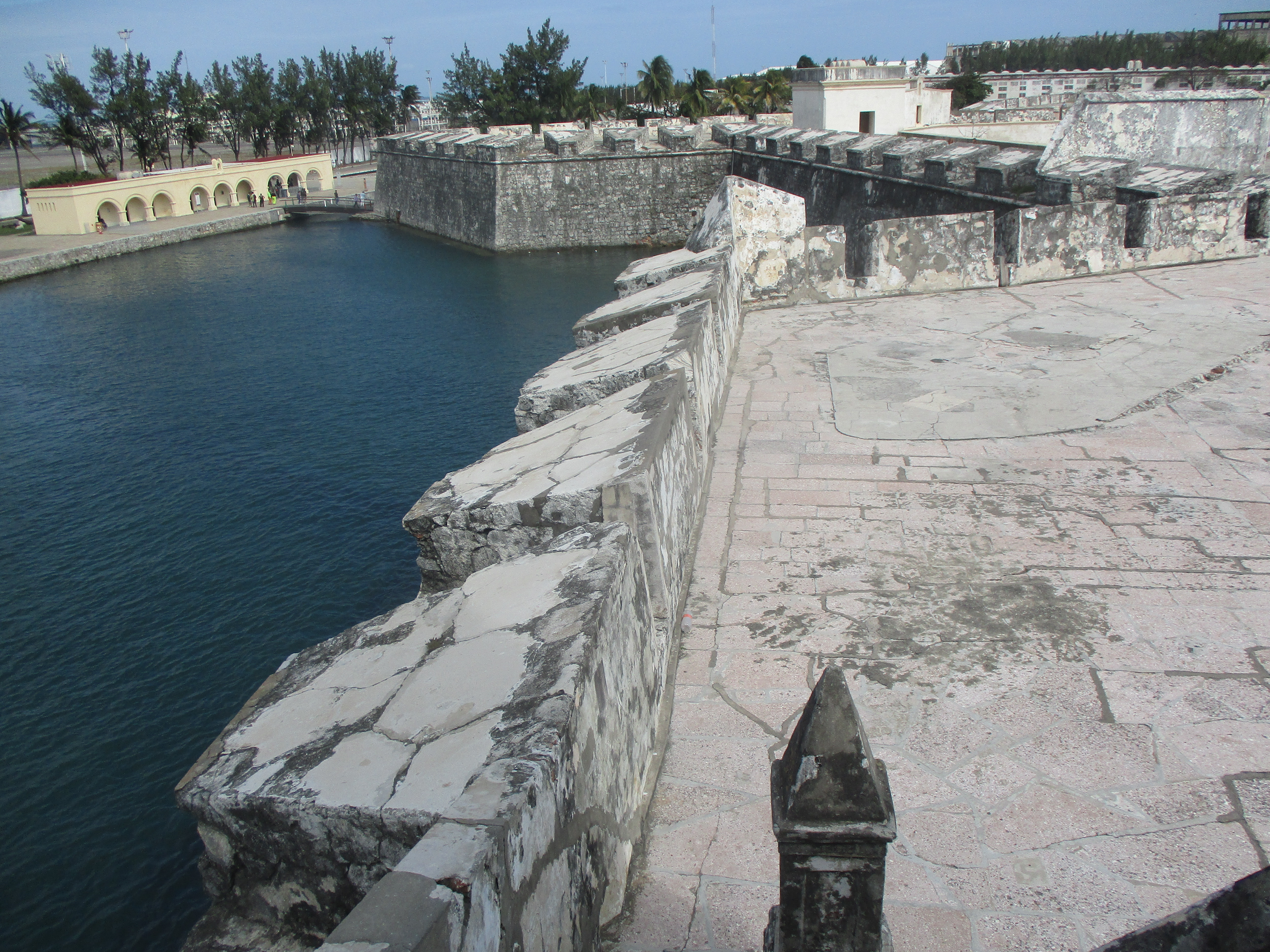
- View of the fortress

Site information
- Type: Fortress
- Controlled by: Instituto Nacional de Antropología e Historia
- Open to the public: Yes
- Condition: Deteriorated
- Website: Official website

Location
- Coordinates: 19°12′33″N 96°7′53″W

Site history
- Built: 1535
- Built by: Spanish Empire
- Materials: Stone
- Battles/wars: Spanish attempts to reconquer Mexico; Mexican–American War; French intervention in Mexico

Garrison information
- Past commanders: Francisco Luján (1568); José Coppinger (1825); Mariano Arista (1838); Juan Morales (1847)

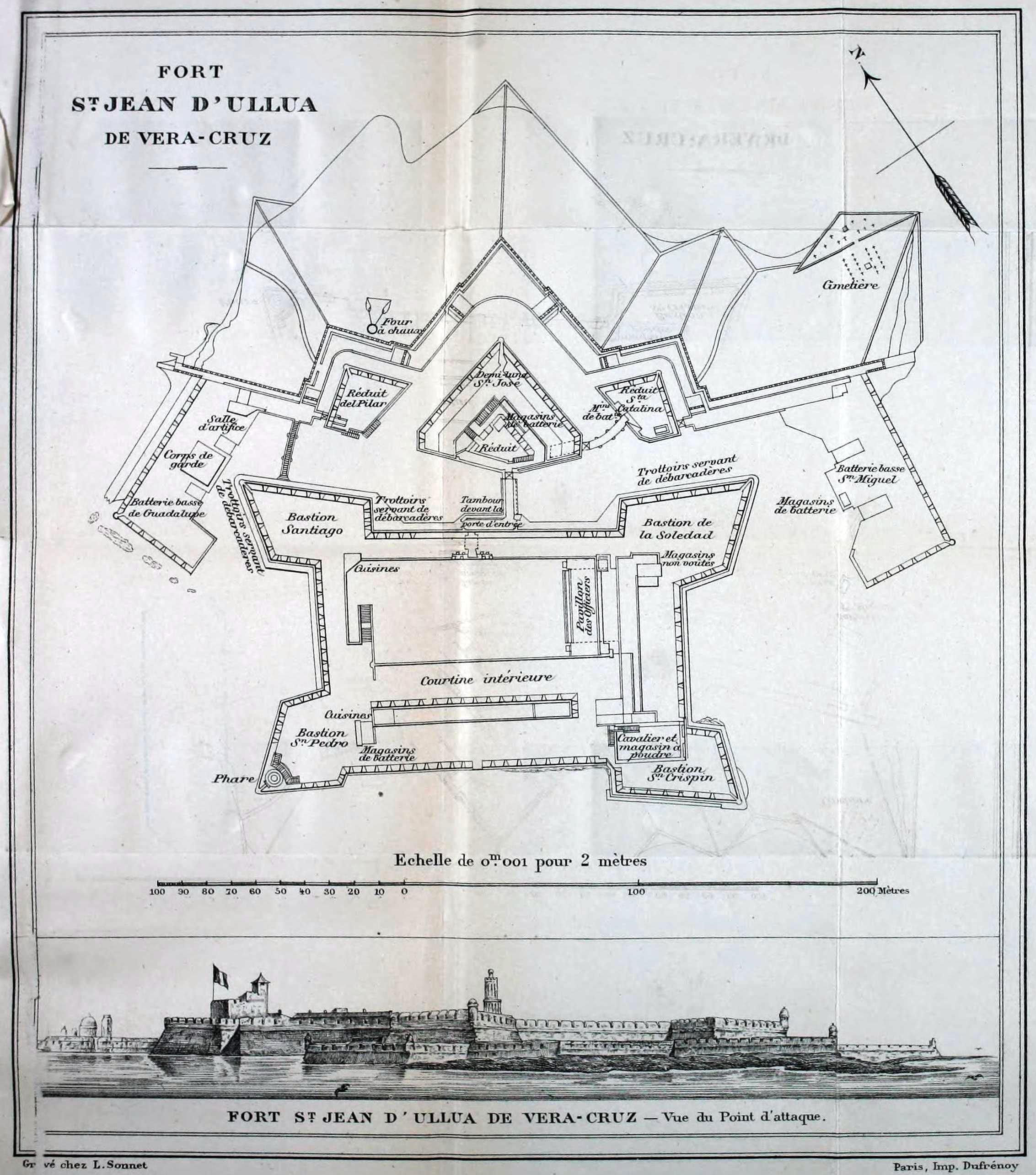
Plan and panoramic view of the fort in 1838 from French map during the war between France and Mexico

San Juan de Ulúa, now known as Castle of San Juan de Ulúa, is a large complex of fortresses, prisons and one former palace on an island of the same name in the Gulf of Mexico overlooking the seaport of Veracruz, Mexico. Juan de Grijalva's 1518 expedition named the island. On March 30, 1519, Hernan Cortés met with Tendile and Pitalpitoque, emissaries from Moctezuma II's Aztec Empire.

It was built between 1535 and 1769. There is a local museum of the fortress, inaugurated in 1984.

== History ==
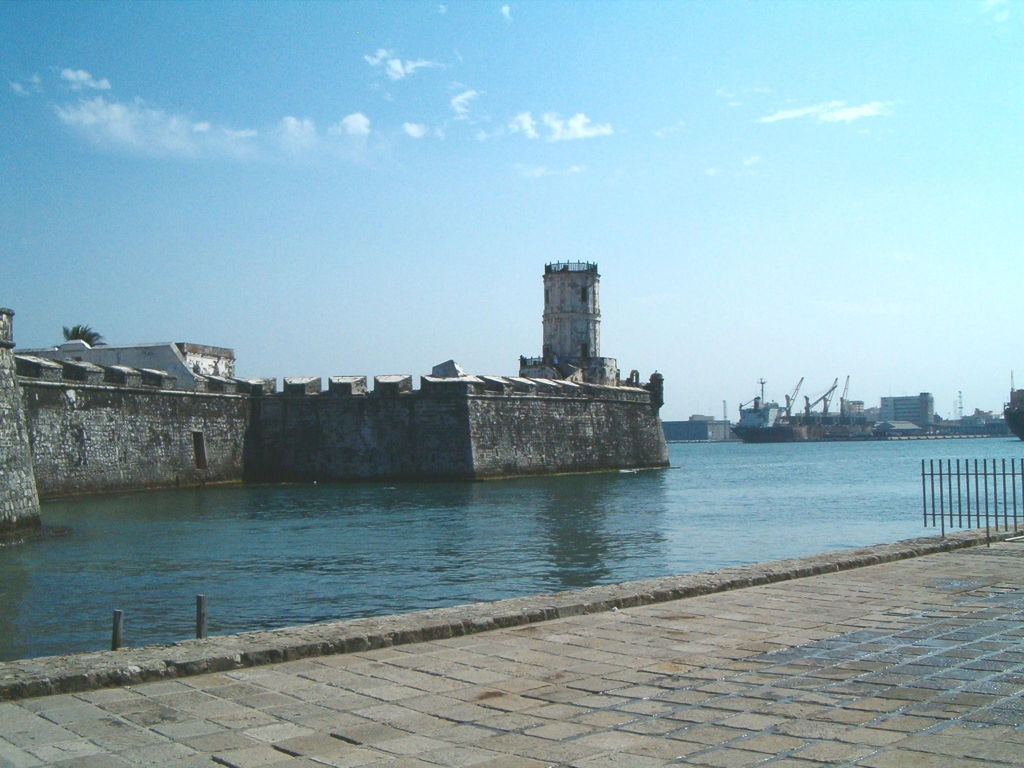
The fortress overlooking the Port of Veracruz

The fort was built during the period of Spanish colonial rule, begun in 1535 by the Spanish authorities. The boundaries of the fort were repeatedly expanded during its existence. The fortress saw no action after the 1560s under Spanish control, becoming an isolated outpost of the Spanish Army in New Spain. In the 1580s, Battista Antonelli redesigned the fortress during a stopover en route to the Gulf of Fonseca.

It saw no action during the Mexican War of Independence, being too far away from the main areas of fighting.

=== Privateer encounter ===
In 1568, the Spanish forces stationed on the fortress succeeded in trapping a privateer fleet under the command of John Hawkins in the fortress's harbor. The commanders under Hawkins included his cousin, the young Francis Drake. Although Hawkins and Drake both managed to escape the organized entrapment on their respective warships, many of the trapped sailors aboard the ships were killed by Spanish cannon fire. Several of the privateer warships present were sunk, and several more were damaged beyond repair, and scuttled along the Mexican coastline. The shipwrecked sailors were abandoned by Hawkins, who chose to cut his losses and venture elsewhere on the Spanish Main.

Trapped, and with no rescue in sight, these sailors ventured further inland, where they eventually settled among the local population and integrated into the Mexican populace at large, becoming part of the European diaspora in Mexico. Hawkins, along with Drake, continued his attacks on Spanish shipping of valuable cargo such as gold and silver from Spanish colonies in Latin America to Spain. The attack by the Spaniards at San Juan de Ulúa is credited as marking Drake's first feelings of intense hatred of both Catholicism and the Spanish, which would both go on to have an influence on his later career.

== The Virgin of the Staircase on top of the Port of Veracruz ==
The fort once held the icon of the La Virgen de La Escalera (Virgin of the Staircase), whose little chapel entrance was under the stone staircase leading to the Baluarte de San Crispin fort, near the chancery, ammunition room, and treasury room. Whenever ships arrived into the bay, this Marian icon was raised to the top tower to greet them, and they would fire cannons in her honor. The Virgen de La Escalera was known to these travelers and to the surrounding villages in Veracruz. The original icon has been missing for hundreds of years, its memory lost, ever since Mexico gained independence as this restricted entrance into the walled citadel and broke the Manila galleon trade linking Veracruz with Havana, Puerto Rico, Portobelo, Callao, San Blas, the shipyards of Barra de Navidad, Acapulco, the shipyards of Cavite, and eventually, Manila.

A near replica (some dispute as the true statue) of the Virgen de La Escalera was brought by the Antonio Fernandez de Roxas family (ancestors of the Zobel de Ayala clan also descended from the Zangroniz clan of railroad barons), via the Road of the Viceroys / El Camino de los Virreyes to Mexico City and then down to the Pacific port of Acapulco in Guerrero, and sailed to Manila centuries ago. In the mid-1800s, one of the Roxas descendants of Don Jose Bonifacio Roxas donated the icon from their family farm house in Calatagan where they owned a gigantic encomienda, the Hacienda Bigaa, to the nearby town of Nasugbu in the province of Batangas (they once owned parts of this town as well). The Virgen de Escalera is still venerated, loved, and fiestas are held in her honor, to this day, every year on the 2nd of December. Her feast day is known for the crowds of Filipinos that come to offer thanks and to pray the rosary, as well as watch a bull run called Fiesta De Los Toros, and another one, called Parada de Los Toros, highlighting cows and water buffalo and carromatas (a type of farm buggy or cart) festooned with flowers in a colorful parade, following the blessing of the farm animals.

== Post-Spanish era ==
After Mexico's independence in 1821, a large body of Spanish troops continued to occupy San Juan de Ulúa as late as 1825. It was the last site in the former Kingdom of New Spain to be held by the Spanish and was surrendered to Mexican General Miguel Barragán in November 1825. The justification for the order of expulsion issued by President Vicente Guerrero was their failed attempt to re-conquer Mexico. Since then, San Juan de Ulúa has served as a military and political symbol of Mexican resistance to foreign invasions and occupations, several of which took place during the 19th century. In 1838 the French bombarded the fortress in the Battle of Veracruz during the Pastry War, a conflict resulting from a French citizen in Mexico seeking reparations for his allegedly damaged pastry shop; during the Mexican–American War, a conflict which resulted from disputes over the nascent Republic of Texas, the United States laid siege to the fortress, and in 1863, the French briefly occupied the city while installing Maximilian I as Emperor of Mexico. For much of the 19th century, the fort served as a prison, especially for political prisoners judged to be opposition to the government. Many prominent Mexican politicians spent time here while they were not in power.

The last foreign incursion came in 1914, on the eve of World War I, when an American expedition captured and occupied Veracruz as a response to the Tampico Affair against the background of the Mexican Revolution; which threatened the regional oil industry in which Americans were heavily invested. After a short but bloody firefight the Americans captured the city, including San Juan de Ulúa. After seven months of U.S. occupation, the Americans departed and handed back the city to the Mexicans. The national legislature awarded the port and city of Veracruz the title of Heroic for the fourth time following this incident. A portion of San Juan de Ulúa also served several times as the presidential palace, housing presidents such as Benito Juárez and Venustiano Carranza. The citadel was also used as a prison, especially during the early 20th-century regime of President Porfirio Díaz. It was alleged by some sources that in order to prevent prisoners from escaping, sharks were placed into the waters surrounding the island, so that they would kill anyone attempting to escape.

== Modern times ==
The fortress was ultimately closed (decommissioned) when it was no longer required for the defense of Mexico, being too impractical to serve as a modern naval base. After several years of decay, renovations were begun on the complex in the late 20th century. Some of the renovation projects are still under construction today. San Juan de Ulúa has been preserved in a somewhat deteriorated form and has been transformed into a museum open to the public. The prison, along with the remaining fortress complex are all open to the public, with the exception of the former presidential palace, which suffered severe decay and is still undergoing renovations as of 2020.

The complex is a very popular tourist attraction among the Mexican public. The fortress has also been featured in Hollywood movies, with San Juan de Ulúa being used to depict the fortress in Cartagena, Colombia, in the climax of the 1984 film Romancing the Stone.

== Gallery ==
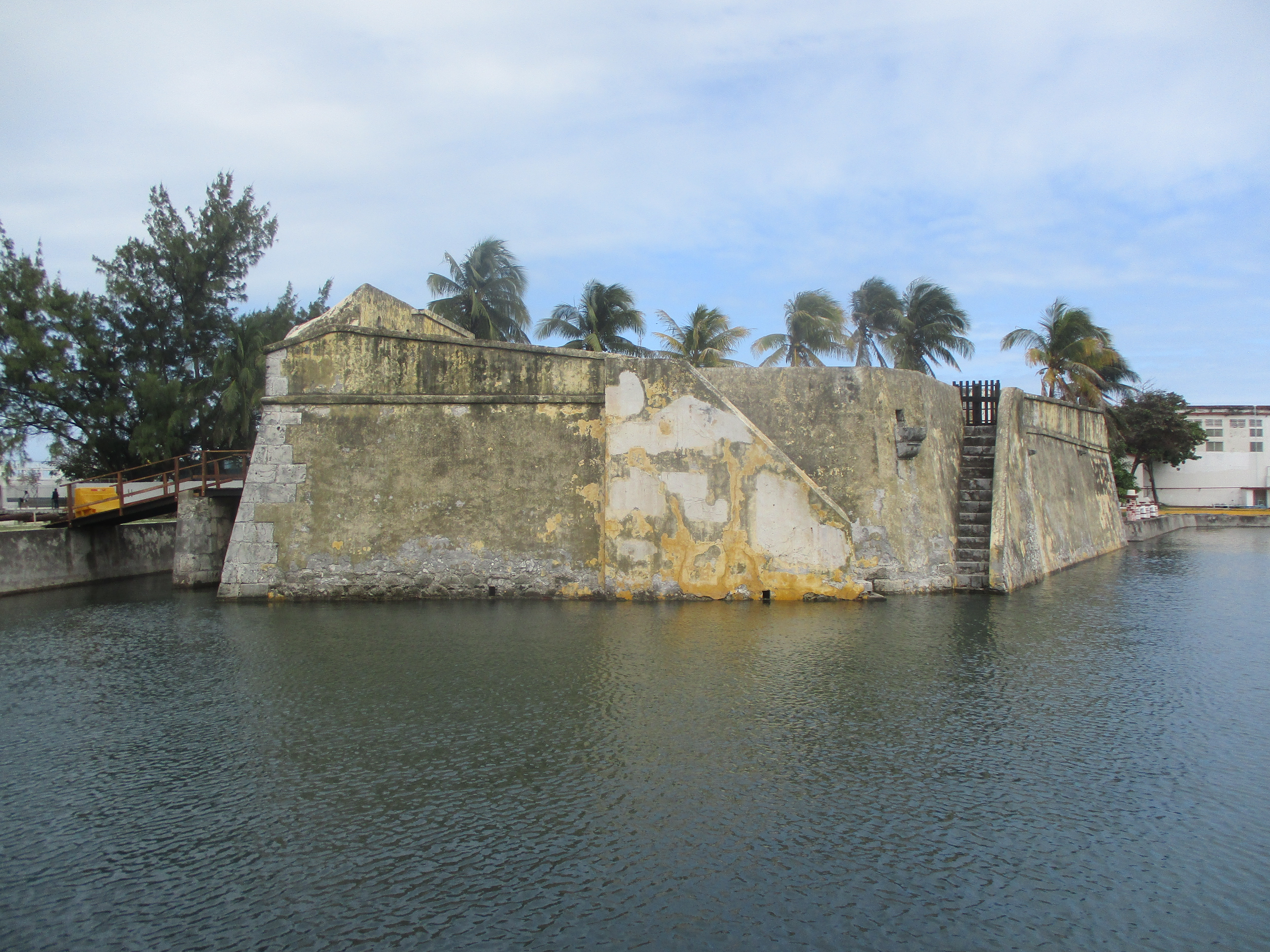

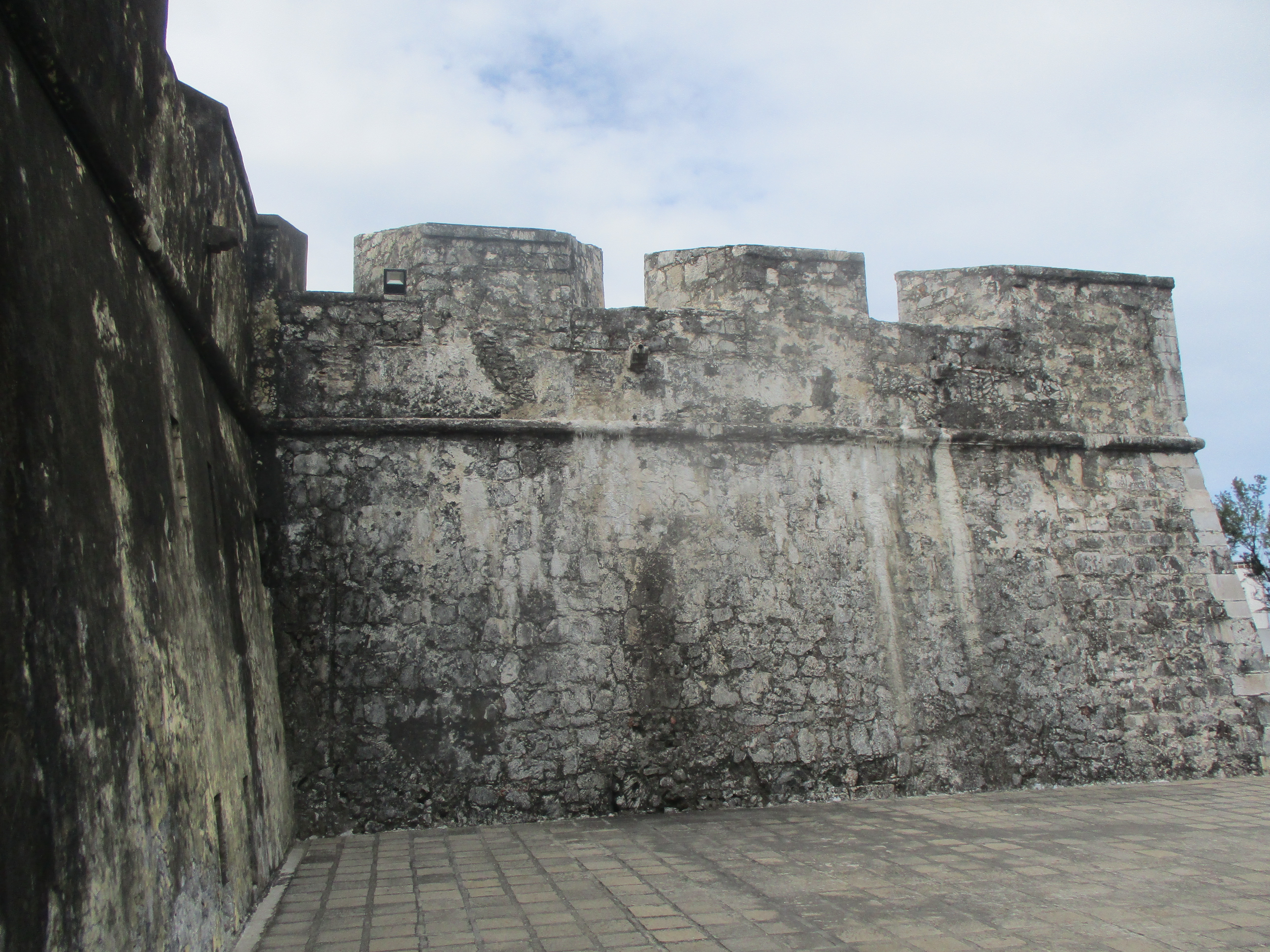

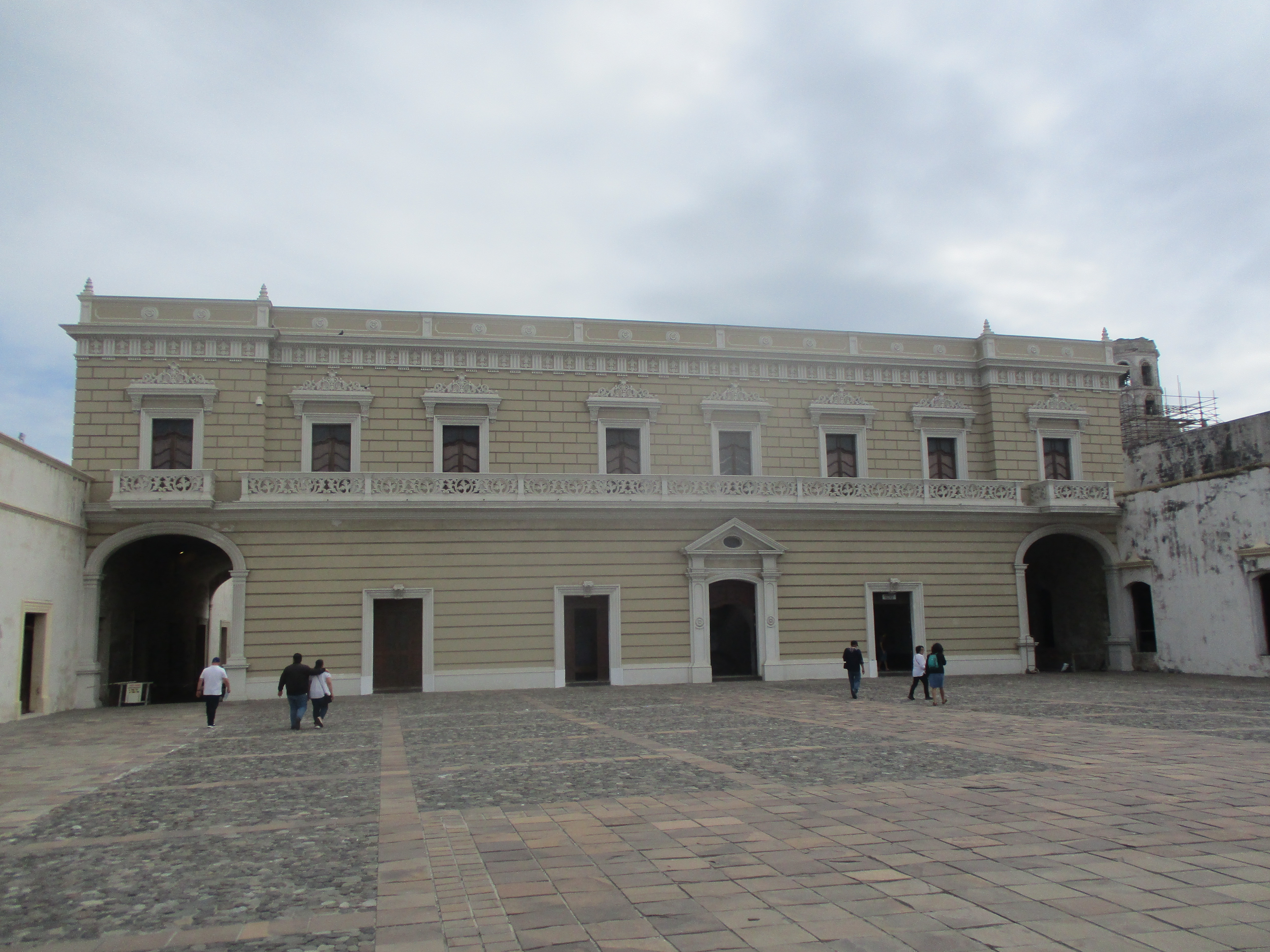

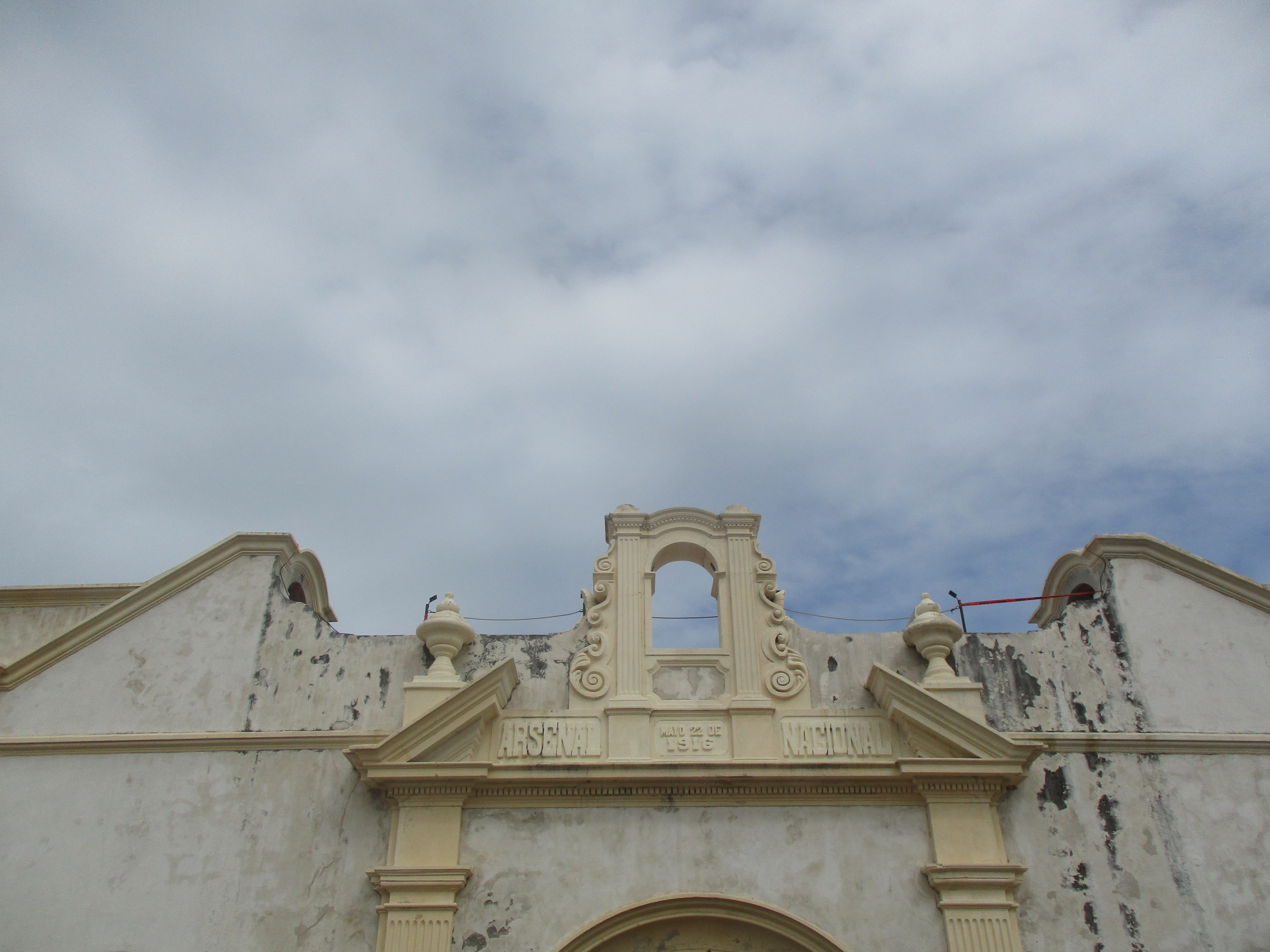

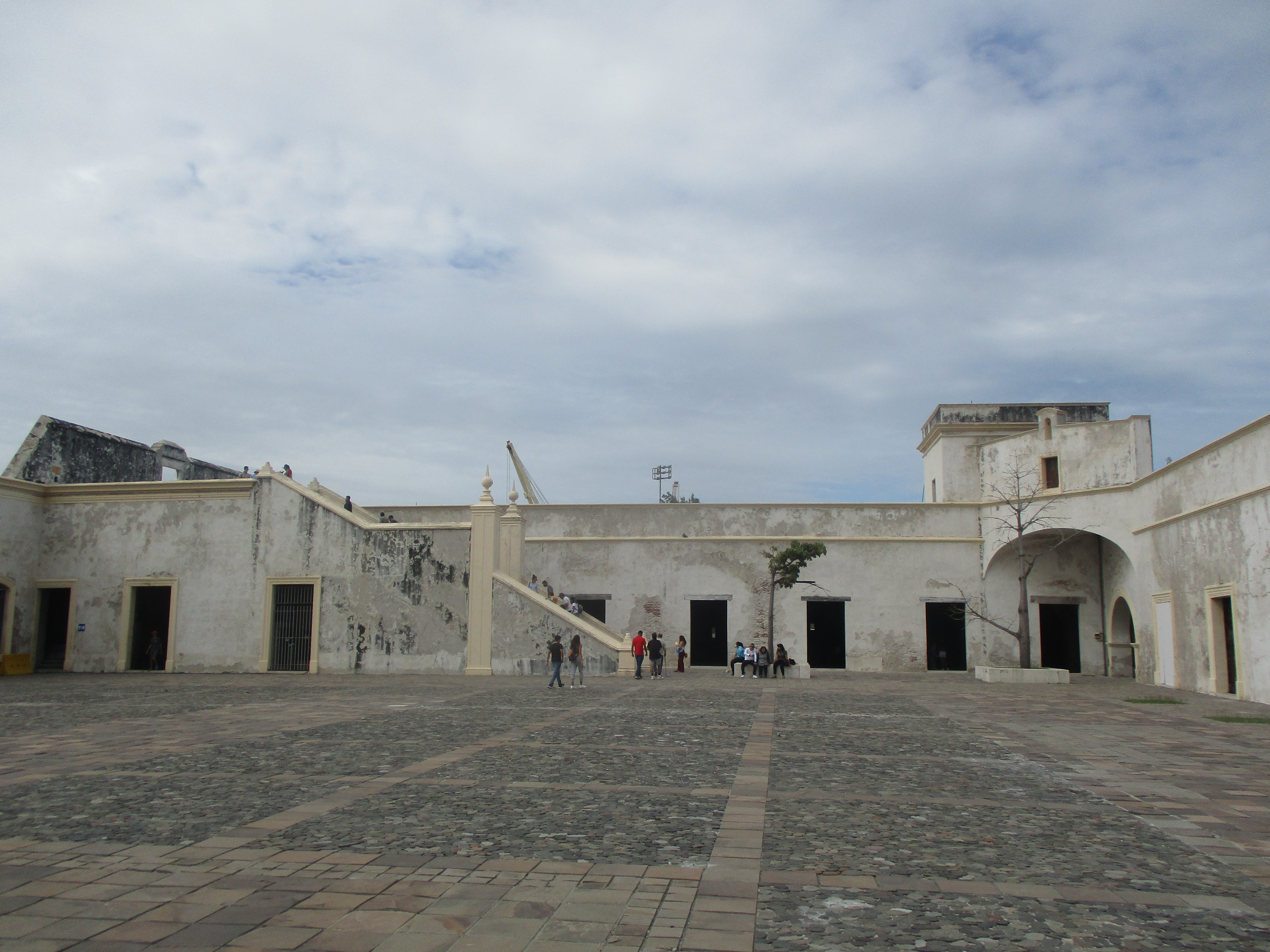

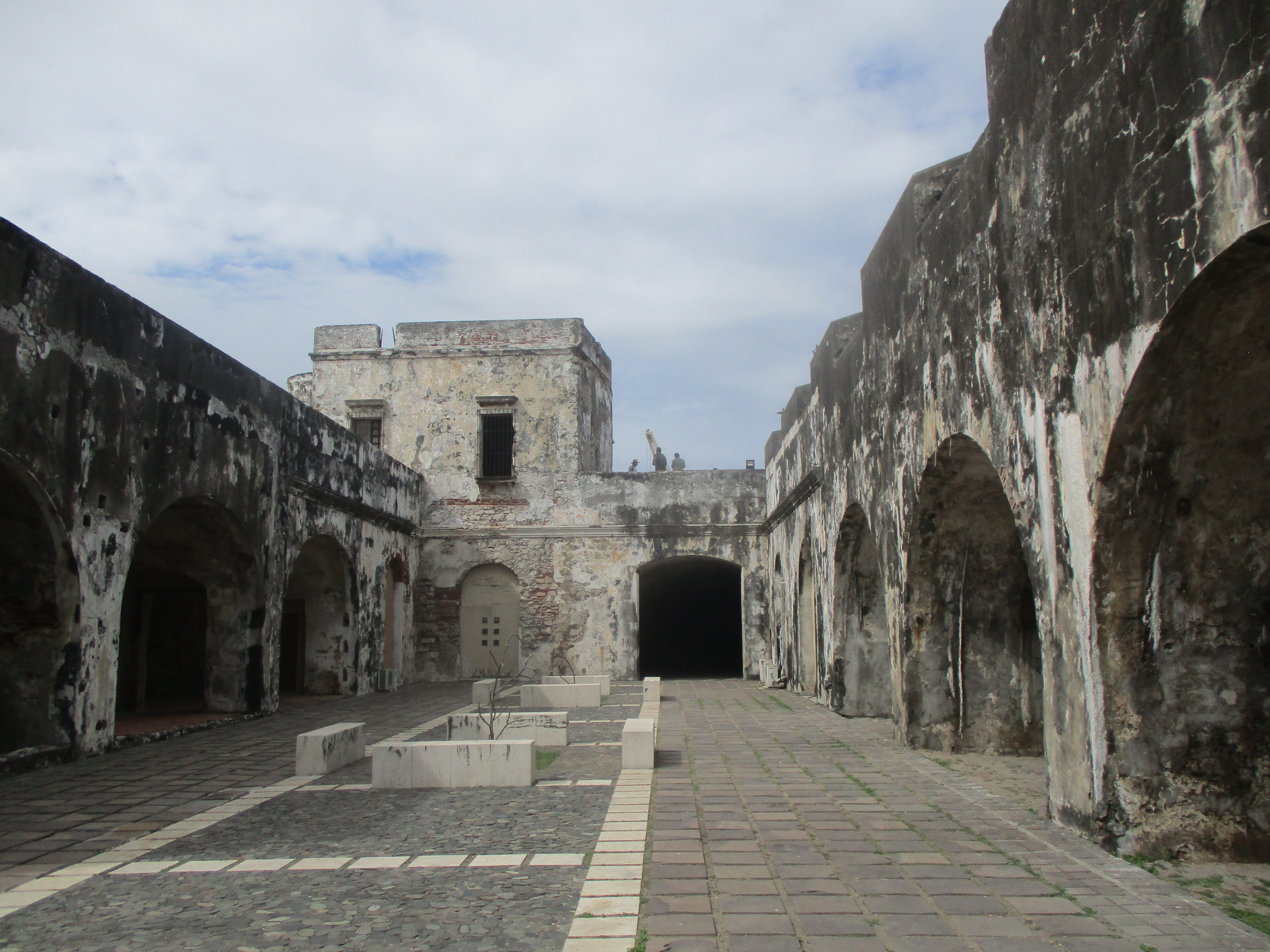

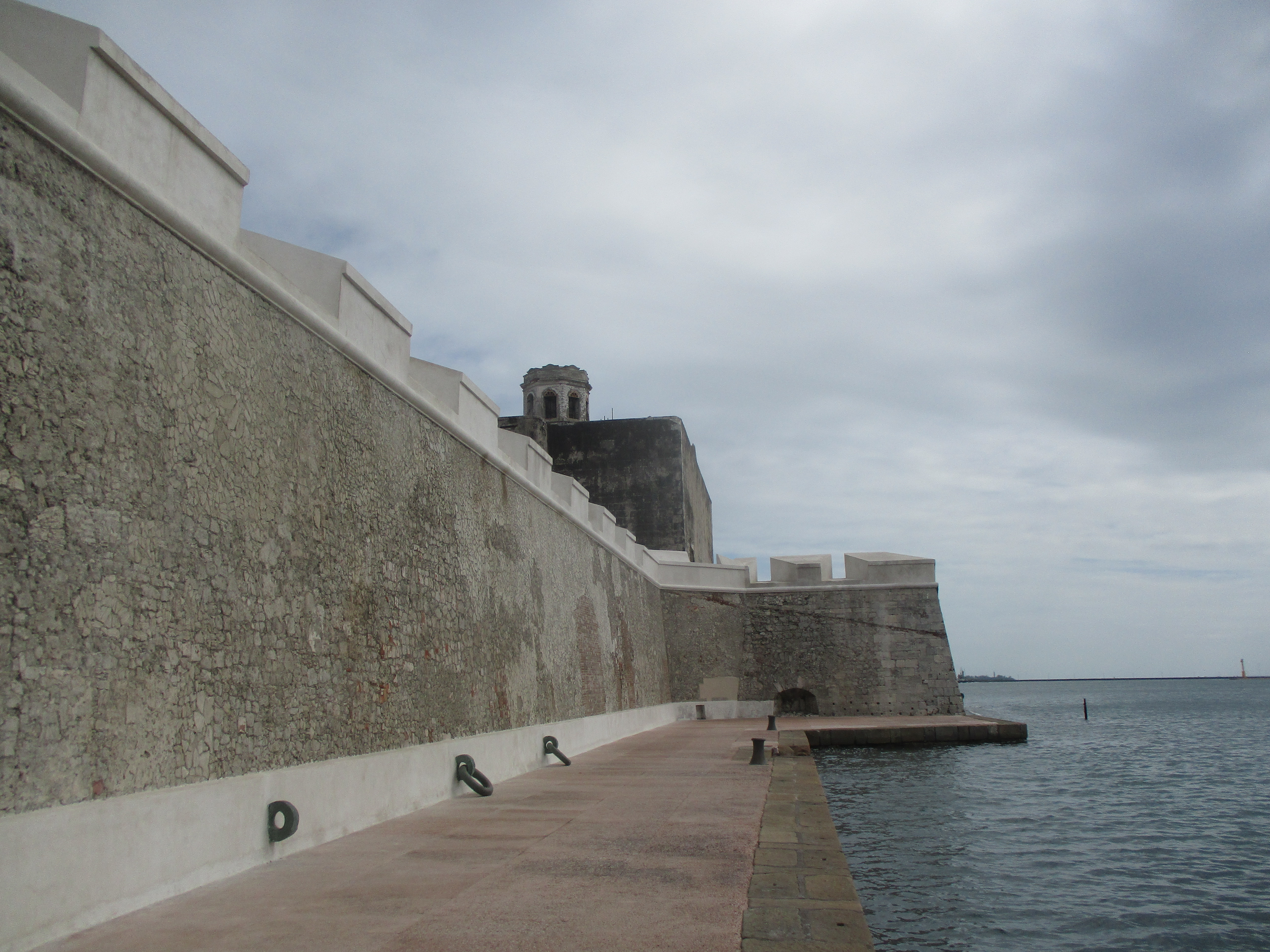

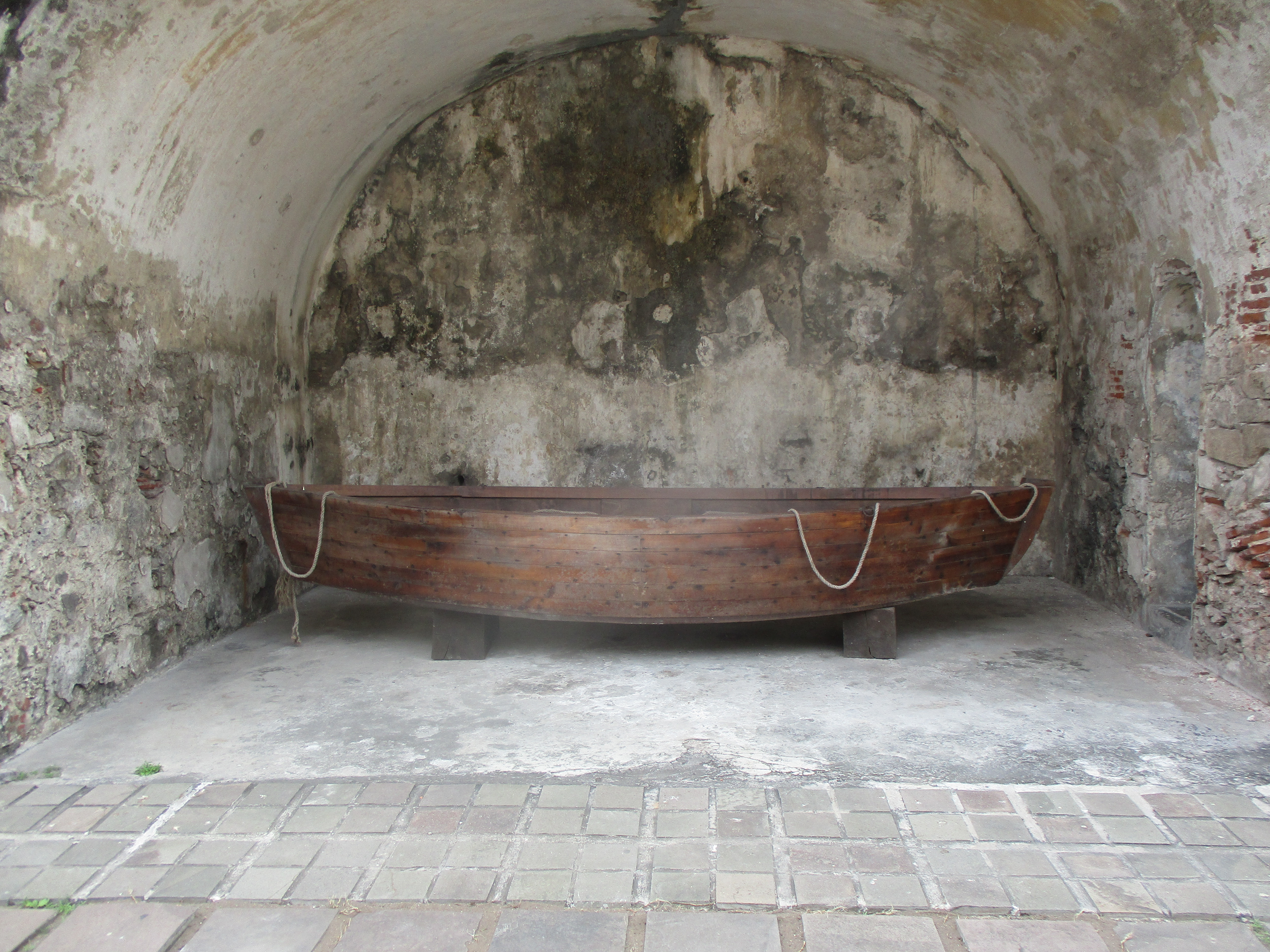

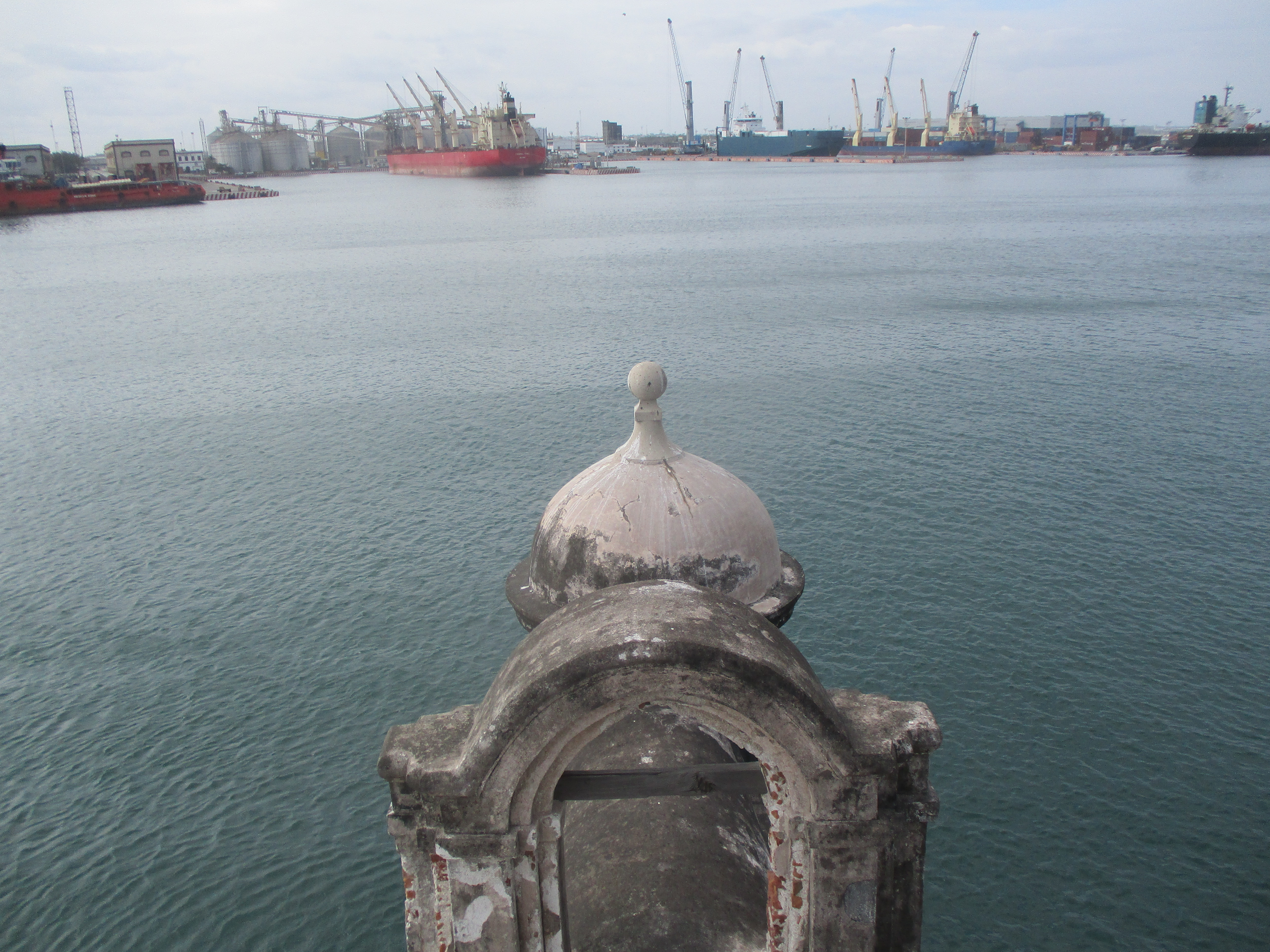

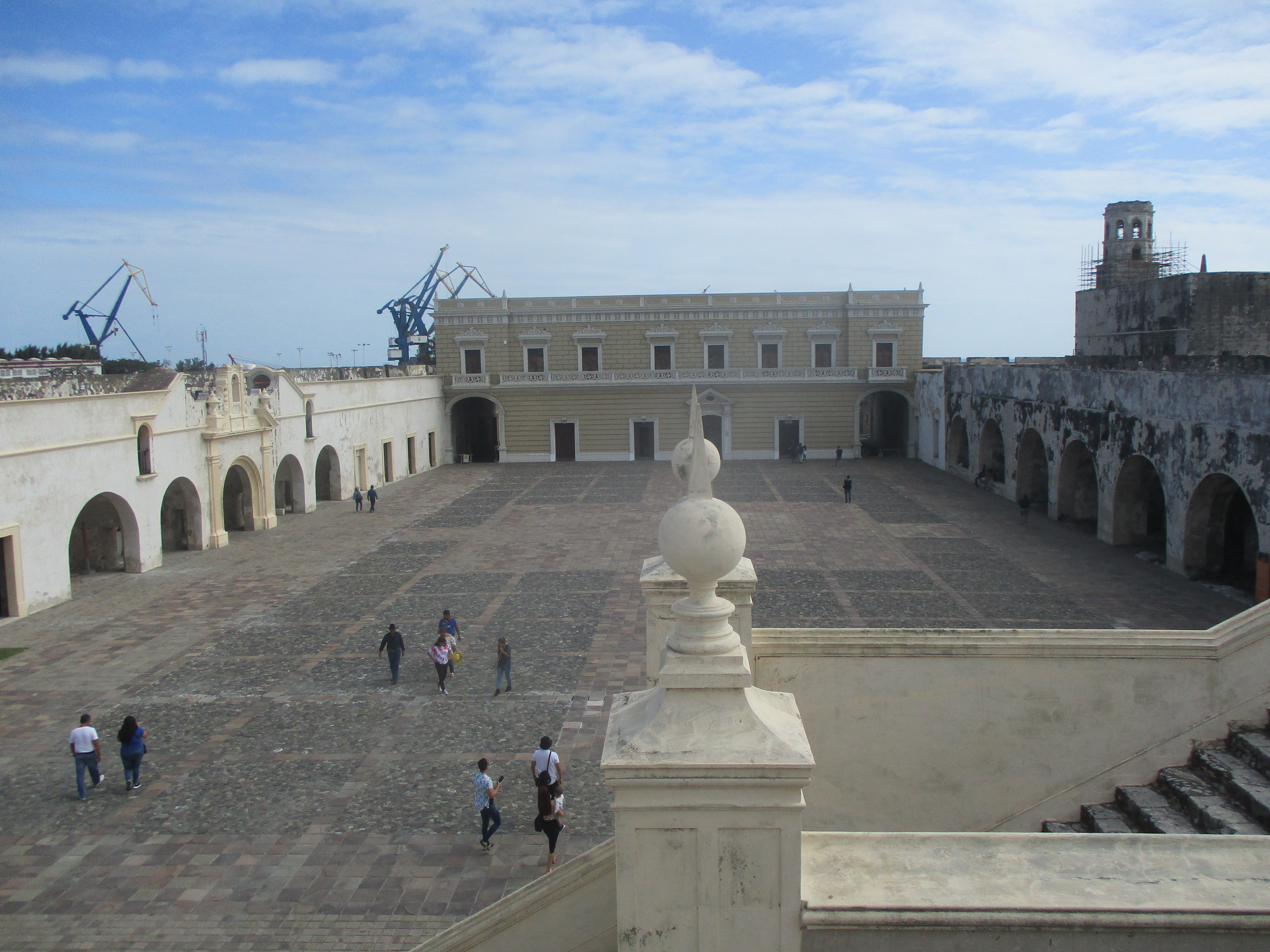

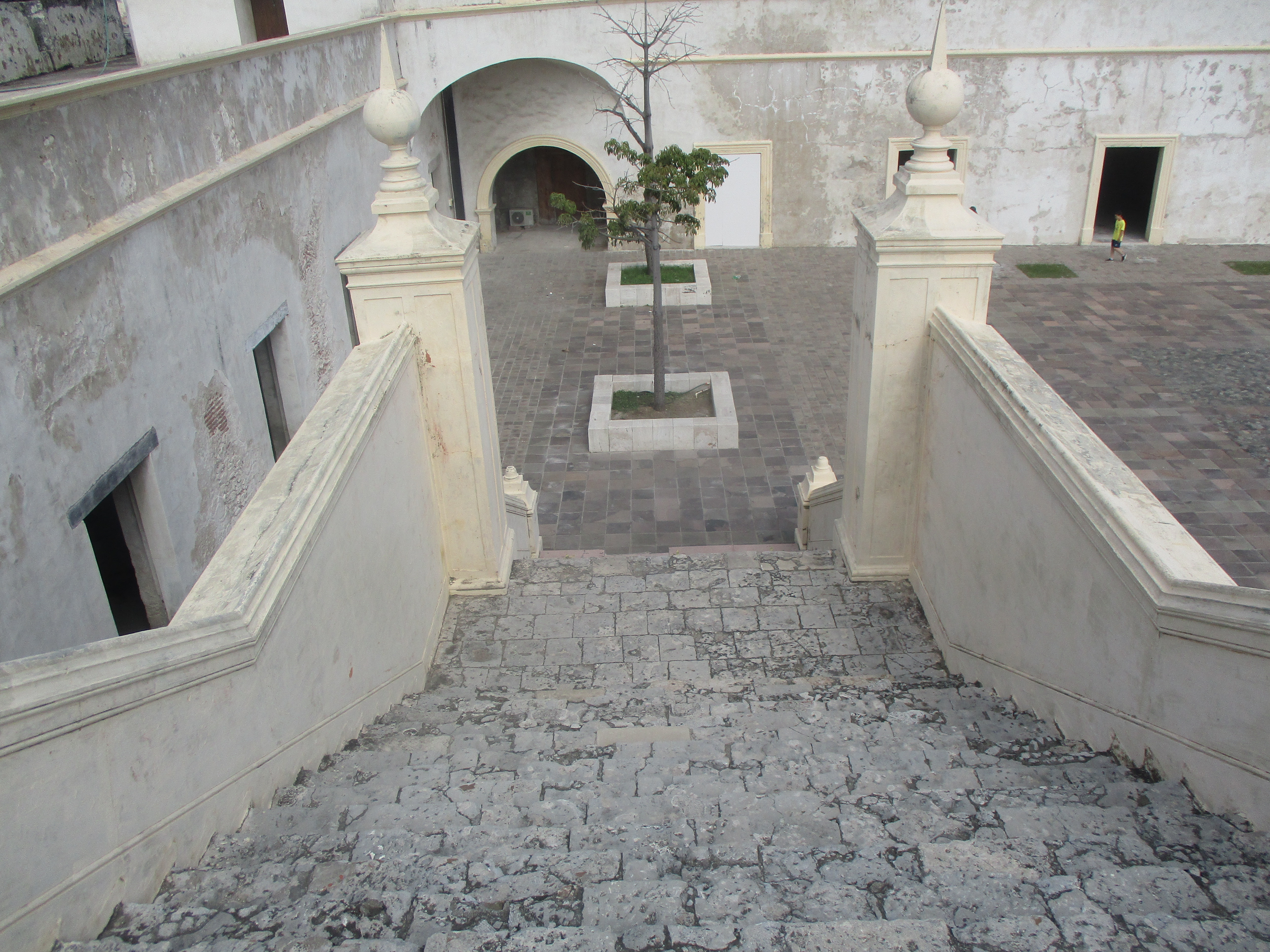

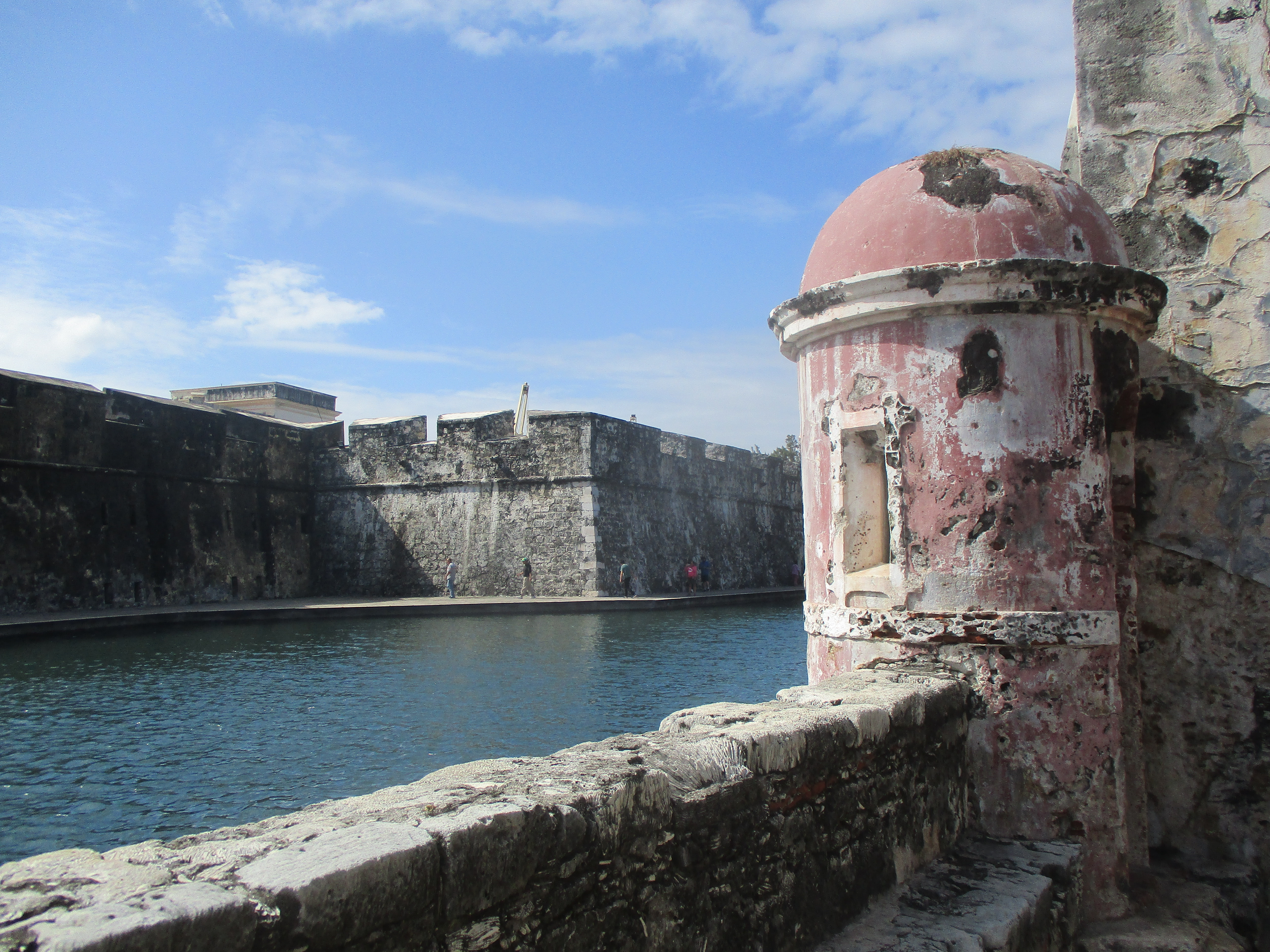

== See also ==
- San Carlos Fortress
