= Pastry War =

1838–1839 war between Mexico and France

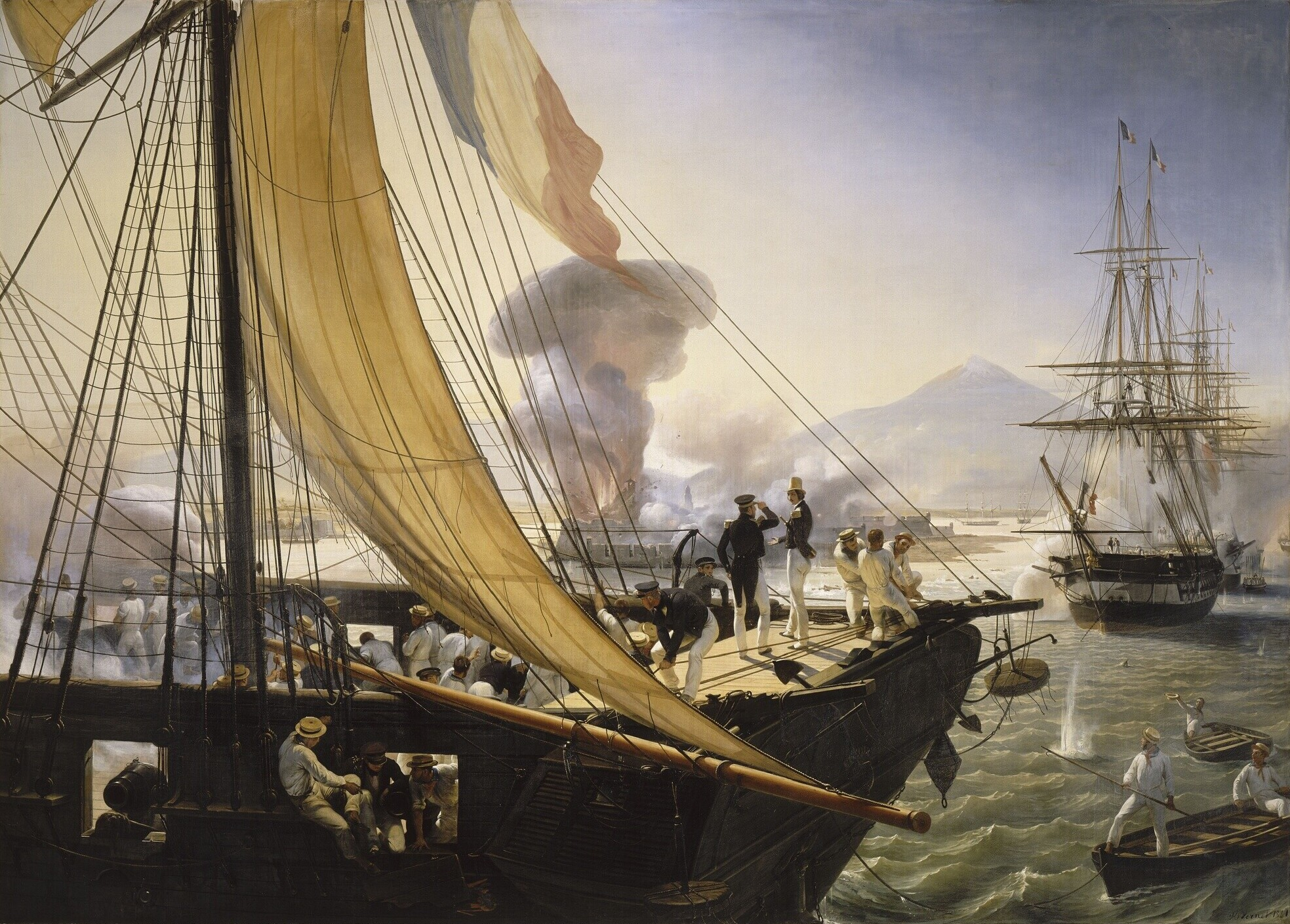
- 1841 painting of the Battle of Veracruz
Date	27 November 1838 – 9 March 1839 (3 months, 1 week and 3 days)
Location	Veracruz, Mexico
Result	French victory

Belligerents
France	Mexico

Commanders and leaders
Charles Baudin	Santa Anna (WIA)

Strength
4,000; 26 ships	3,229; 1 fort

Casualties and losses
121 killed or wounded	224 killed or wounded 1 fort captured

The Pastry War (Note: Spanish: Guerra de los pasteles; French: Guerre des Pâtisseries) (Note: Also known as the first French intervention in Mexico or First Franco-Mexican War) began in November 1838 when French naval forces blockaded ports in Mexico, and captured San Juan de Ulúa in Veracruz. This was in response to allegations of mistreatment of French nationals in Mexico, including a pastry chef after whom the war was named, and ended in March 1839 with a British-brokered peace. A second French intervention in Mexico followed in the 1860s.

== Background ==
During the early years of the new Mexican republic, there was widespread civil disorder as factions competed for control of the country. The fighting often resulted in the destruction or looting of private property. Average citizens had few options for claiming compensation as they had no representatives to speak on their behalf. Foreigners whose property was damaged or destroyed by rioters or bandits were usually also unable to obtain compensation from the Mexican government and they began to appeal to their own governments for help and compensation.

Commercial relationships between France and Mexico existed prior to Spain's recognition of Mexico's independence in 1830, and after the establishment of diplomatic relationships France rapidly became Mexico's third largest trade partner. French goods were subject to higher taxes as France had yet to secure trade agreements similar to those which had been established by the United States and United Kingdom, Mexico's two largest trade partners.

== Chronology ==
In a complaint to King Louis-Philippe, a French pastry chef known only as Monsieur Remontel said that in 1832 Mexican officers looted his shop in Tacubaya (then a town on the outskirts of Mexico City). Mexican sources said that the officers, from Santa Anna's government, simply refused to pay their bills. Remontel demanded 60,000 pesos as reparations for the damage (his shop was valued at less than 1,000 pesos).

In view of Remontel's complaint (which gave its name to the ensuing conflict) and of other complaints from French nationals (among them the looting in 1828 of French shops at the Parian market and the execution in 1837 of a French citizen accused of piracy), in 1838 prime minister Louis-Mathieu Molé demanded from Mexico the payment of 600,000 pesos (3 million Francs) in damages.

When President Anastasio Bustamante made no payment, the French king ordered a fleet under Rear Admiral Charles Baudin to declare and carry out a blockade of all Mexican ports on the Gulf of Mexico from Yucatán to the Rio Grande, to bombard the Mexican fortress of San Juan de Ulúa, and to seize the city of Veracruz, which was the most important port on the Gulf coast. French forces captured Veracruz by December 1838 and Mexico declared war on France.

With trade cut off, the Mexicans began smuggling imports in Mexico via Corpus Christi (then part of the Republic of Texas). Fearing that France would blockade the Republic's ports as well, a battalion of Texan forces began patrolling Corpus Christi Bay to stop Mexican smugglers. One smuggling party abandoned their cargo of about a hundred barrels of flour on the beach at the mouth of the bay, thus giving Flour Bluff its name. The United States soon sent the schooner Woodbury to help the French in their blockade.

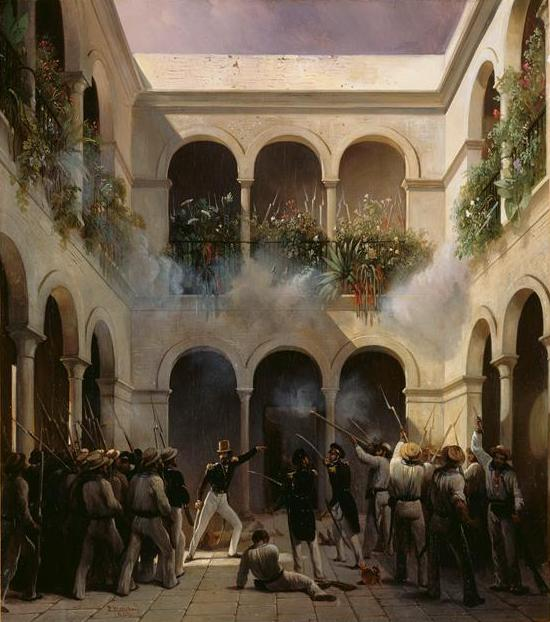
French troops under Prince de Joinville attack the residence of General Arista in Veracruz, 1838. Painting by Pharamond Blanchard.

Meanwhile, acting without explicit government authority, Antonio López de Santa Anna, known for his military leadership, came out of retirement from his hacienda named "Manga de Clavo" near Xalapa and surveyed the defenses of Veracruz. He offered his services to the government, which ordered him to fight the French by any means necessary. He led Mexican forces against the French and fought at the Battle of Veracruz in 1838. In a skirmish with the rear guard of the French, Santa Anna was wounded in the leg by French grapeshot. His leg was amputated and buried with full military honors. Santa Anna returned to power.

== Peace restored ==
The French forces withdrew on 9 March 1839 after a peace treaty was signed. As part of the treaty, the Mexican government agreed to pay 600,000 pesos as damages to French citizens, while France received promises for future trade commitments in place of war indemnities. The damages were never paid, and this fact was later used as one of the justifications for the second French intervention in Mexico of 1861.

Following the Mexican victory in 1867 and the collapse of the Second French Empire in 1870, Mexico and France would not resume diplomatic relationships until 1880 when both countries renounced claims related to the wars.
