= HMS Satellite (1826) =

Sloop of the Royal Navy

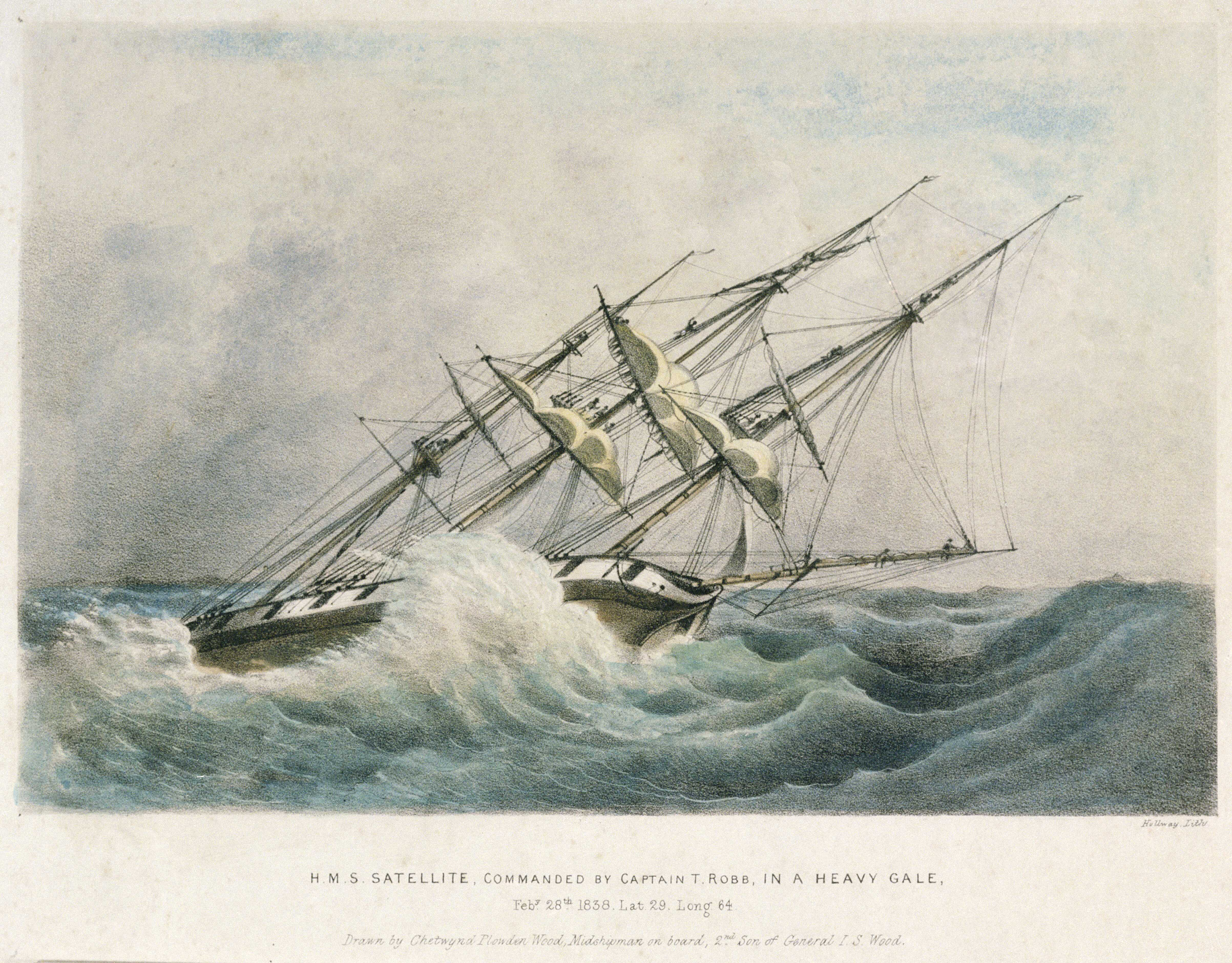
- HMS Satellite commanded by Captain T. Robb in a heavy gale, Feb 28th 1838. Lat 29. Long 64.

History

United Kingdom
- Name: Satellite
- Ordered: 9 June 1825
- Builder: Pembroke Dockyard
- Laid down: June 1826
- Launched: 3 October 1826
- Completed: 14 February 1827
- Commissioned: 22 November 1826
- Fate: Broken up, February 1849

General characteristics
- Class & type: Satellite-class sloop
- Tons burthen: 466 41/94 bm
- Length: 112 ft (34.1 m) (gundeck); 92 ft 1 in (28.1 m) (keel)
- Beam: 31 ft 2 in (9.5 m)
- Draught: 11 ft 9 in (3.6 m)
- Depth: 13 ft 10 in (4.2 m)
- Complement: 125
- Armament: 2 × 6-pdr cannon; 16 × 32-pdr carronades

HMS Satellite was an 18-gun sloop, the name ship of her class, built for the Royal Navy during the 1820s.

== Description ==
Satellite had a length at the gundeck of 112 feet (34.1 m) and 94 feet 2 inches (28.7 m) at the keel. She had a beam of 31 feet 2 inches (9.5 m), a draught of 11 feet 9 inches (3.6 m) , and a depth of hold of 13 feet 10 inches (4.2 m). The ship's tonnage was 466 41/94 tons burthen. The Satellite class was armed with a pair of 9-pounder cannons in the bow and sixteen 32-pounder carronades. The ships had a crew of 125 officers and ratings.

== Construction and career ==
Satellite, the third ship of her name to serve in the Royal Navy, was ordered on 9 June 1825, laid down in June 1826 at Pembroke Dockyard, Wales, and launched on 3 October 1826. She was completed on 14 February 1827 at Plymouth Dockyard and commissioned on 22 November 1826.
