= French frigate Néréide (1836) =

52-gun frigate of the French Navy

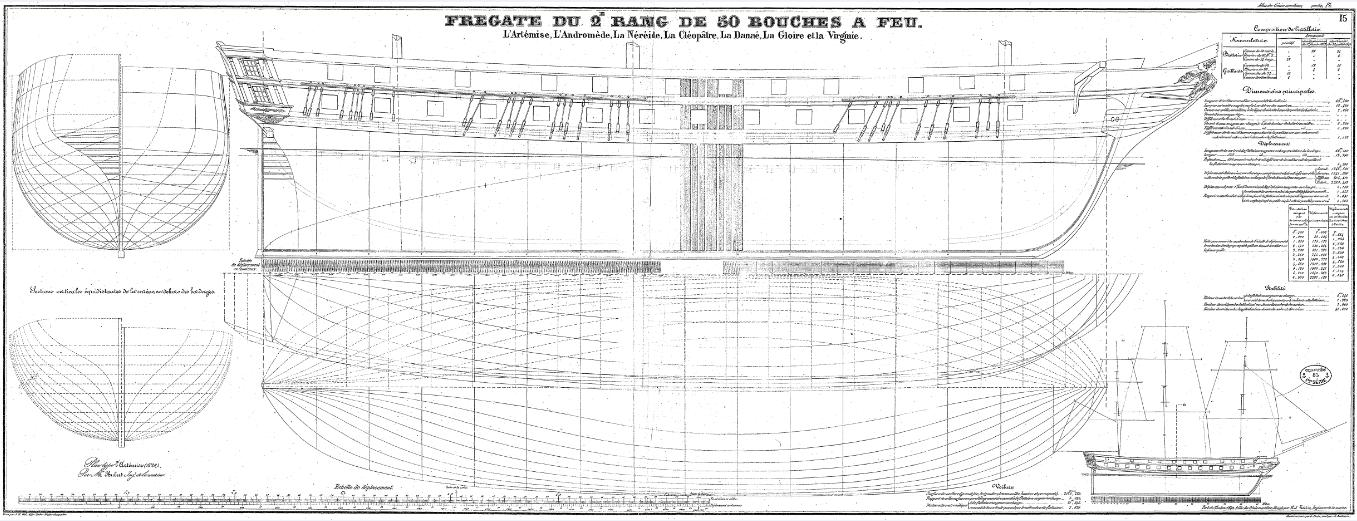
- Plans of Néréide

History

France
- Name: Néréide
- Namesake: Nereid
- Builder: Lorient
- Laid down: 1 August 1828
- Launched: 17 February 1836
- Stricken: 1896
- Fate: Broken up 1896

General characteristics
- Type: Frigate
- Displacement: 2,154 tonnes
- Propulsion: Sail
- Armament: 52 guns

Néréide was a 52-gun frigate of the French Navy. She took part in the Battle of Veracruz soon after her commissioning.

As a transport, she took part in the Crimean War.

She was eventually decommissioned in 1887, and broken up in 1896.

== See also ==
- List of French sail frigates
