= French frigate Gloire (1837) =

French naval vessel

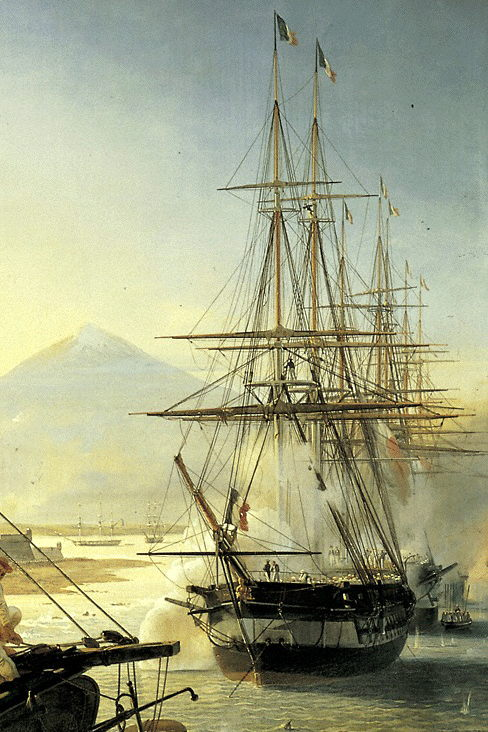
- Gloire leading the French line of battle at the Battle of Veracruz (detail of a painting by Horace Vernet).

History

France
- Name: Gloire
- Namesake: Glory
- Builder: Rochefort
- Laid down: 1827
- Launched: 12 December 1837
- Decommissioned: 10 August 1847
- Fate: Wrecked 18 August 1847

General characteristics
- Propulsion: Sail
- Armament: 52 guns

Gloire was a 52-gun frigate of the French Navy. She took part in the Battle of Veracruz in Mexico soon after her commissioning.

Gloire was decommissioned in Brest in 1843, but reactivated in 1847 under Captain Lapierre for operations in the Sea of China. She took part in the Bombardment of Tourane on 15 April 1847.

On 18 August 1847, she ran aground on an island off the western coast of Korea, along with the frigate Victorieuse. Two boats made it to Shanghai to request assistance, and the marooned crew was picked up by HMS Daedalus, HMS Espiegle, and HMS Childers on 12 September 1847.
