= Gordon Head =

Coordinates: 48°29′00″N 123°19′00″W

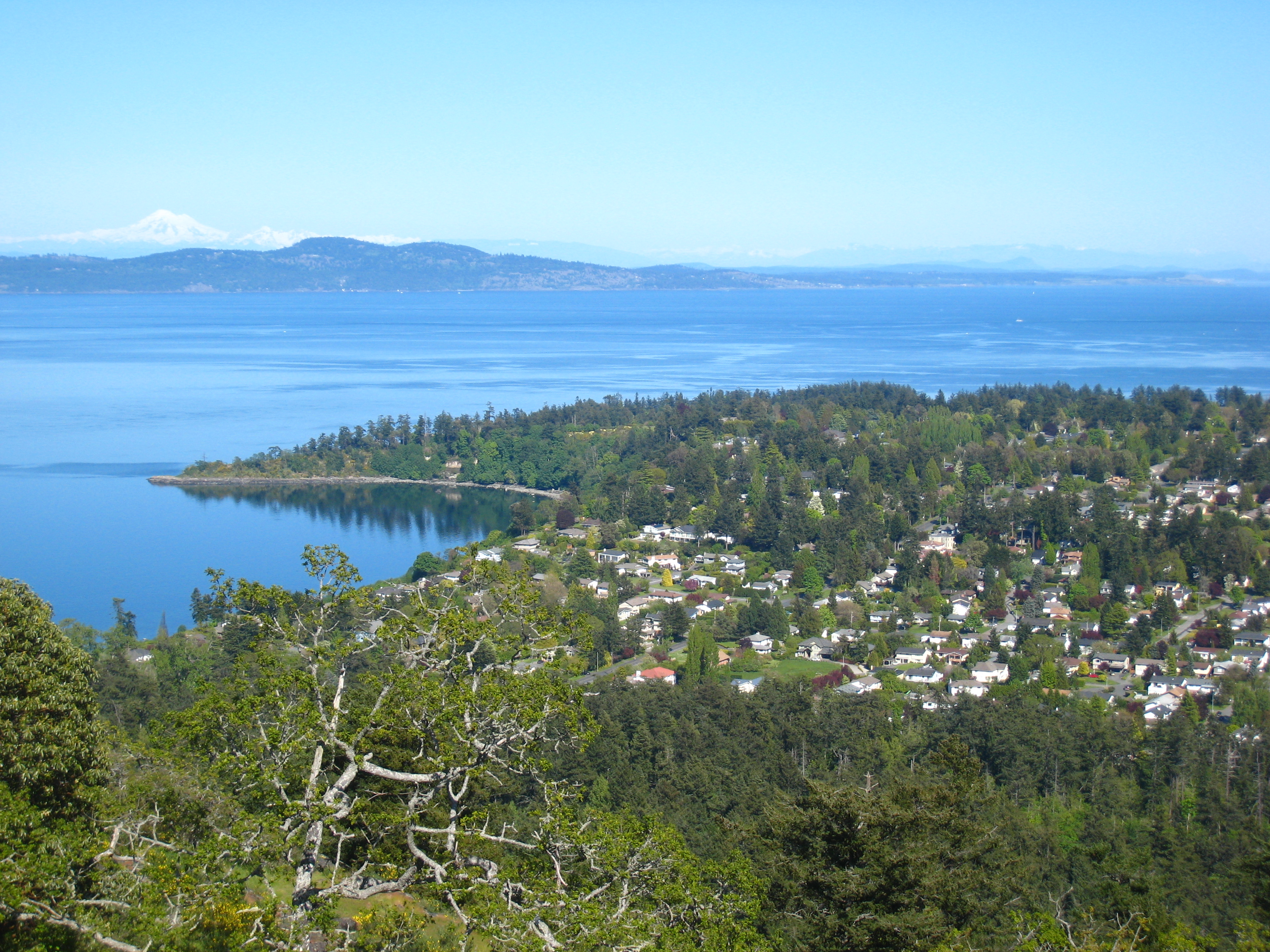
Gordon Head

Gordon Head is a seaside neighbourhood in the municipality of Saanich in Greater Victoria, British Columbia, Canada. Gordon Head lies north of McKenzie Avenue and east of the Blenkinsop Valley. The University of Victoria is located partly within Gordon Head along the southeast boundary. Finnerty Road separates Gordon Head from the adjacent neighbourhood of Cadboro Bay. The local area is dominated physically by Mount Douglas (SENĆOŦEN: PKOLS), a coastline along Haro Strait, and the central plateau.

== History ==
For 4,000 years the Songhees people inhabited the lands between Sooke and the Saanich Peninsula, which includes Gordon Head.

In 1852, with the signing of the Douglas Treaties, farmers began settling the hitherto densely forested Gordon Head area. By 1860, thirteen men, including Michael Finnerty and John Work, owned all of the land. The region would become famous for its strawberries and later its daffodils. City water service was introduced in 1921, leading to a proliferation of greenhouses and vegetable farming. Agriculture dominated the landscape until about the 1950s, when Gordon Head began gradually developing into a residential neighbourhood.

During World War II, a Special Wireless Station was established at Gordon Head in June 1940. It played a significant role in the Royal Canadian Navy's radio intelligence operation against the Japanese. Messages were intercepted here and bearings on enemy transmissions were provided using direction finding techniques. The station closed in 1946; however, the building that housed the station still stands in a remote corner of the University of Victoria, having been moved from its original location.

Today, many homes in Gordon Head have secondary suites or are rented out entirely to students at the University of Victoria.

== Name ==
The neighbourhood shares its name with the small strip of land that juts out into Haro Strait, east of Margaret Bay, in the community's north-east corner. Gordon Head is named after Admiral John Gordon, who in 1845 commanded HMS America in the North Pacific.

== Parks ==
Gordon Head has 28 parks ranging in size from the minuscule Balmacarra Park to the magnificent 184-hectare PKOLS (Mount Douglas Park, the largest park in Saanich.

Several parks offer beach access. The half-rocky, half-sandy beach that spans Arbutus Cove Park and Hollydene Park is Gordon Head's most frequented beach.

== Schools ==
Six schools in the Greater Victoria School District (SD61) call the community home:

Elementary

- Hillcrest
- Torquay

Middle

- Arbutus
- Gordon Head

Secondary

- Lambrick Park
- Mount Douglas

Maria Montessori Academy is an independent school located in Gordon Head.

== Gordon Head Recreation Centre ==
GHRC is centrally located and features a pool, sauna, steamroom, whirlpool, weightroom, dance and fitness studio, as well as a skateboard/rollerblade park.

Recent eco-friendly updates to the centre include UV pool filtration (in addition to the existing chlorine-based system) and solar-powered showers.

== Retail locations ==
- Torquay Village
- Tuscany Village

== Pedestrian shortcuts ==
Sprinkled across the community are dozens of pedestrian shortcuts. (The adjacent neighbourhoods of Cadboro Bay and Cordova Bay have relatively few shortcuts by comparison.)

A map showing the shortcuts (in dotted red) is available on OpenStreetMap.
