= The Song of Hiawatha =

1855 epic poem by Henry Wadsworth Longfellow

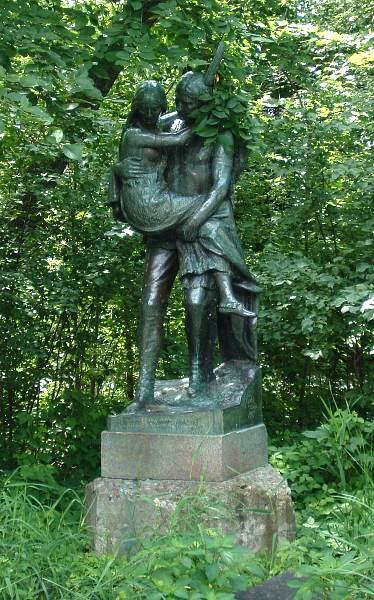
- Hiawatha and Minnehaha, a bronze sculpture created by Jacob Fjelde in 1912 near Minnehaha Falls in Minneapolis
- Author: Henry Wadsworth Longfellow
- Language: English
- Genre: Epic poetry; National epic
- Publisher: Ticknor and Fields, among others
- Publication date: 1855
- Publication place: United States of America
- Text: The Song of Hiawatha at Wikisource

The Song of Hiawatha is an 1855 epic poem in trochaic tetrameter by Henry Wadsworth Longfellow which features Native American characters. The epic relates the fictional adventures of an Ojibwe warrior named Hiawatha and the tragedy of his love for Minnehaha, a Dakota woman. Events in the story are set in the Pictured Rocks area of Michigan on the south shore of Lake Superior. Longfellow's poem is based on oral traditions surrounding the Ojibwe folk hero Manabozho, but also contains Longfellow's own innovations.

Longfellow drew some of his material from his friendship with Ojibwe chief Kahge-ga-gah-bowh (George Copway), who would visit Longfellow's home. He also had frequent encounters with Black Hawk and other Sauk people on Boston Common, and he drew from Algic Researches (1839) and other writings by Henry Rowe Schoolcraft, an ethnographer and United States Indian agent, and from Heckewelder's Narratives. In sentiment, scope, overall conception, and many particulars, Longfellow insisted, "I can give chapter and verse for these legends. Their chief value is that they are Indian legends."

Longfellow had originally planned on following Schoolcraft in calling his hero Manabozho, the name in use at the time among the Ojibwe of the south shore of Lake Superior for a figure of their folklore who was a trickster and transformer. But he writes in his journal entry for June 28, 1854: "Work at 'Manabozho;' or, as I think I shall call it, 'Hiawatha'—that being another name for the same personage." Longfellow was following Schoolcraft, but he was mistaken in thinking that the names were synonymous. The name Hiawatha is derived from a pre-colonial figure associated with the League of the Haudenosaunee located in New York and Pennsylvania. The popularity of Longfellow's poem nevertheless led to the name "Hiawatha" becoming associated with a number of locales and enterprises in the Great Lakes region.

== Publication and plot ==
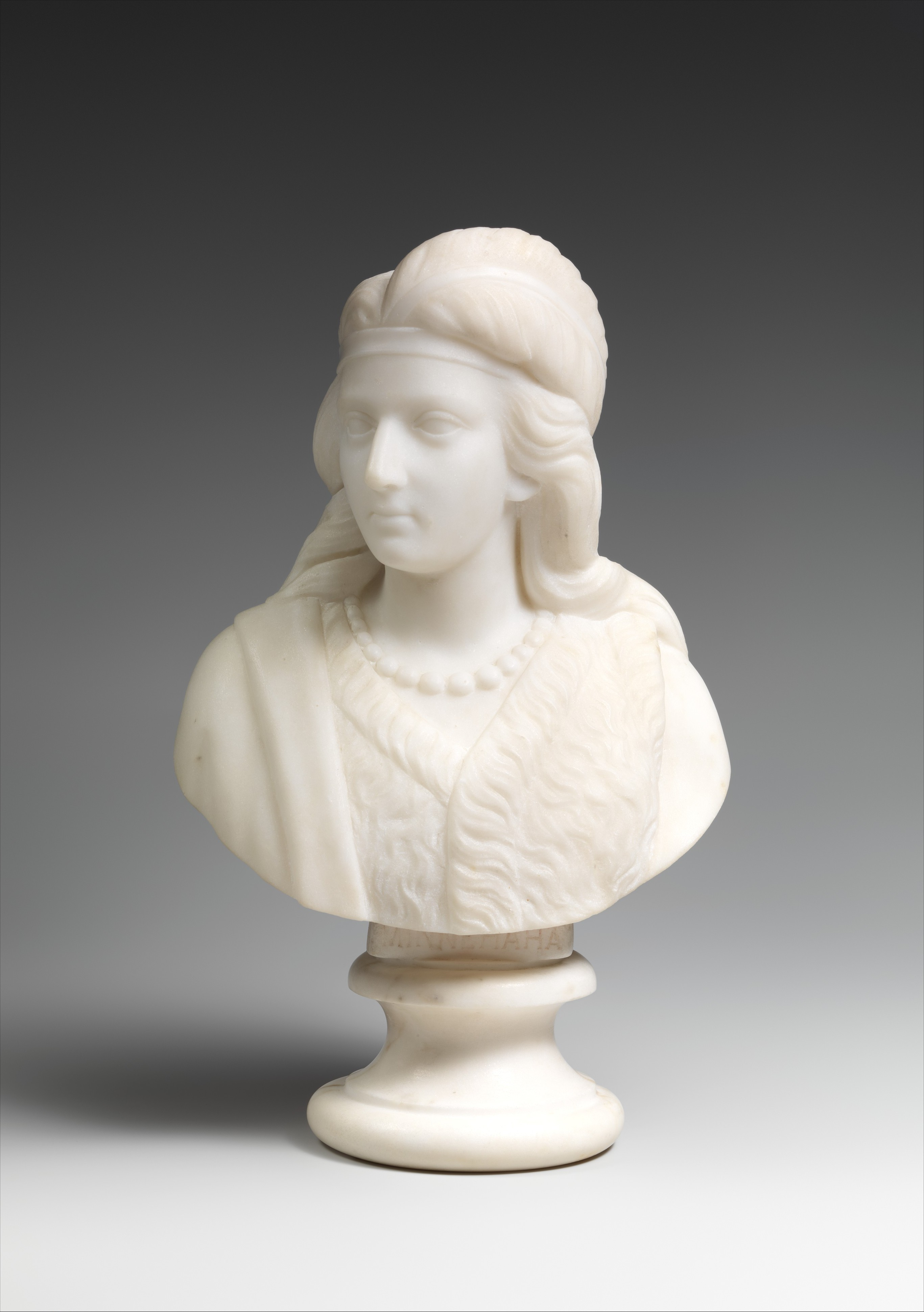
Minnehaha, a marble statue created in 1868 by Edmonia Lewis, now on display at the Metropolitan Museum of Art in New York City

The poem was published on November 10, 1855, by Ticknor and Fields and was an immediate success. In 1857, Longfellow calculated that it had sold 50,000 copies. Longfellow chose to set The Song of Hiawatha at Pictured Rocks, one of the locations along the south shore of Lake Superior favored by narrators of the Manabozho stories. The Song presents a legend of Hiawatha and his lover Minnehaha in 22 chapters (and an introduction). Hiawatha is not introduced until Chapter III.

In Chapter I, Hiawatha's arrival is prophesied by a "mighty" peace-bringing leader named Gitche Manito.

Chapter II tells a legend of how the warrior Mudjekeewis became Father of the Four Winds by slaying the Great Bear of the mountains, Mishe-Mokwa. His son Wabun, the East Wind, falls in love with a maiden whom he turns into the Morning Star, Wabun-Annung. Wabun's brother, Kabibonokka, the North Wind, bringer of autumn and winter, attacks Shingebis, "the diver". Shingebis repels him by burning firewood, and then in a wrestling match. A third brother, Shawondasee, the South Wind, falls in love with a dandelion, mistaking it for a golden-haired maiden.

In Chapter III, in "unremembered ages", a woman named Nokomis falls from the Moon. Nokomis gives birth to Wenonah, who grows to be a beautiful young woman. Nokomis warns her not to be seduced by the West Wind (Mudjekeewis) but she does not heed her mother, becomes pregnant and bears Hiawatha.

In the ensuing chapters, Hiawatha has childhood adventures, falls in love with Minnehaha, slays the evil magician Pearl-Feather, invents written language, discovers corn, and other episodes. Minnehaha dies in a severe winter.

The poem closes with the approach of a birch canoe to Hiawatha's village, containing "the Priest of Prayer, the Pale-face." Hiawatha welcomes him joyously; and the "Black-Robe chief" brings word of Jesus Christ and the Blessed Virgin. Hiawatha and the chiefs accept the Christian message. Hiawatha bids farewell to Nokomis, the warriors, and the young men, giving them this charge: "But my guests I leave behind me/ Listen to their words of wisdom,/ Listen to the truth they tell you." Having endorsed the conversion of the Ojibwe people to the Roman Catholic Church, Hiawatha (similarly to Väinämöinen at the end of the Kalevala) launches his canoe westward toward the sunset and departs forever.

== Folkloric and ethnographic critiques ==
Longfellow used Henry Rowe Schoolcraft as a source of Native American legend. Schoolcraft seems to have been inconsistent in his pursuit of authenticity, as he rewrote and censored sources. The folklorist Stith Thompson, although crediting Schoolcraft's research with being a "landmark," is quite critical of him: "Unfortunately, the scientific value of his work is marred by the manner in which he has reshaped the stories to fit his own literary taste." In addition to Longfellow's own annotations, Stellanova Osborn (and previously F. Broilo in German) tracked down "chapter and verse" for every detail Longfellow took from Schoolcraft. Others have identified words from native languages included in the poem.

Intentionally epic in scope, The Song of Hiawatha is described by its author as "this Indian Edda". But Thompson judges that despite Longfellow's claimed "chapter and verse" citations, the work "produce[s] a unity the original will not warrant," i.e., it is non-Indian in its totality. Thompson finds close parallels in plot between the poem and its sources, with the major exception that Longfellow took legends told about multiple characters and substituted the character Hiawatha as the protagonist of them all. Resemblances between the original stories, as "reshaped by Schoolcraft," and the episodes in the poem are but superficial, and Longfellow omits important details essential to Ojibwe narrative construction, characterization, and theme. This is the case even with "Hiawatha's Fishing," the episode closest to its source. Some important parts of the poem were more or less Longfellow's invention from fragments or his imagination. "The courtship of Hiawatha and Minnehaha, the least 'Indian' of any of the events in Hiawatha, has come for many readers to stand as the typical American Indian tale." Also, "in exercising the function of selecting incidents to make an artistic production, Longfellow ... omitted all that aspect of the Manabozho saga which considers the culture hero as a trickster," this despite the fact that Schoolcraft had already diligently avoided what he called "vulgarisms."

In his book on the development of the image of the Indian in American thought and literature, Roy Harvey Pearce writes about The Song of Hiawatha:

It was Longfellow who fully realized for mid-nineteenth century Americans the possibility of [the] image of the noble savage. He had available to him not only [previous examples of] poems on the Indian ... but also the general feeling that the Indian belonged nowhere in American life but in dim prehistory. He saw how the mass of Indian legends which Schoolcraft was collecting depicted noble savages out of time, and offered, if treated right, a kind of primitive example of that very progress which had done them in. Thus in Hiawatha he was able, matching legend with a sentimental view of a past far enough away in time to be safe and near enough in space to be appealing, fully to image the Indian as noble savage. For by the time Longfellow wrote Hiawatha, the Indian as a direct opponent of civilization was dead, yet was still heavy on American consciences ... The tone of the legend and ballad ... would color the noble savage so as to make him blend in with a dim and satisfying past about which readers could have dim and satisfying feelings.

=== Historical Haudenosaunee Hiawatha ===
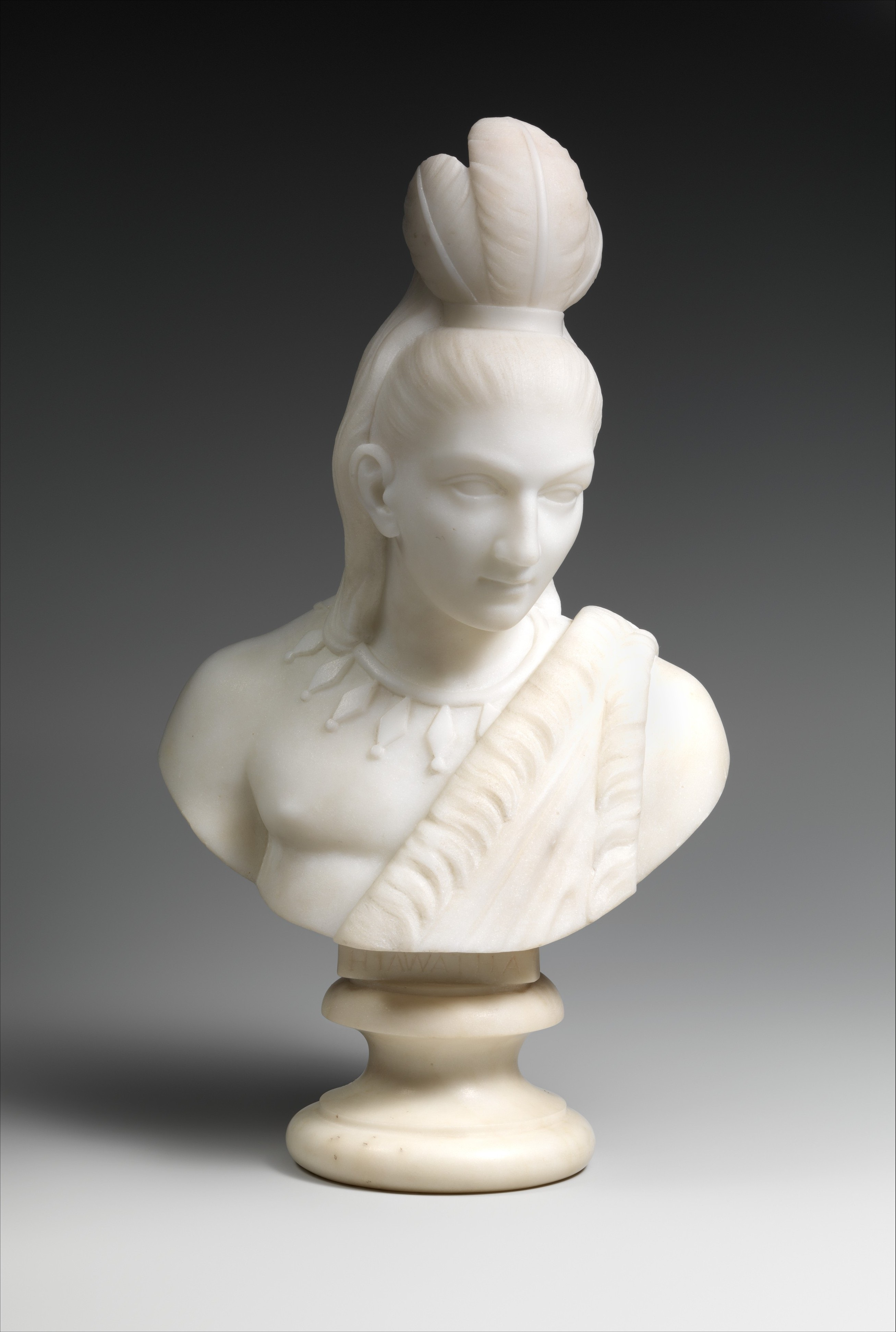
Hiawatha, an 1868 marble statue by Edmonia Lewis now on display at the Metropolitan Museum of Art

Apparently, no connection, apart from name, exists between Longfellow's hero and the legendary Haudenosaunee leader Hiawatha who co-founded the Haudenosaunee Confederacy. Longfellow took the name from works by Schoolcraft, whom he acknowledged as his main source. In his notes to the poem, Longfellow cites Schoolcraft:

a tradition prevalent among the North American Indians, of a personage of miraculous birth, who was sent among them to clear their rivers, forests, and fishing-grounds, and to teach them the arts of peace. He was known among different tribes by the several names of Michabou, Chiabo, Manabozo, Tarenyawagon, and Hiawatha.

Longfellow's notes make no reference to the Haudenosaunee or the Iroquois League or to any historical personage. However, according to 19th century ethnographer Horatio Hale, there was a longstanding confusion between the Haudenosaunee leader Hiawatha and the Haudenosaunee deity Aronhiawagon because of "an accidental similarity in the Onondaga dialect between [their names]." The deity, he says, was variously known as Aronhiawagon, Tearonhiaonagon, Taonhiawagi, or Tahiawagi; the historical Haudenosaunee leader, as Hiawatha, Tayonwatha or Thannawege. Schoolcraft "made confusion worse ... by transferring the hero to a distant region and identifying him with Manabozho, a fantastic divinity of the Ojibways. [Schoolcraft's book] has not in it a single fact or fiction relating either to Hiawatha himself or to the Iroquois deity Aronhiawagon."

In 1856, Schoolcraft published The Myth of Hiawatha and Other Oral Legends Mythologic and Allegoric of the North American Indians, reprinting (with a few changes) stories previously published in his Algic Researches and other works. Schoolcraft dedicated the book to Longfellow, whose work he praised highly. The US Forest Service has said that both the historical and poetic figures are the sources of the name for the Hiawatha National Forest.

=== Indian words used ===
Longfellow cites the Indian words he used as from the works by Schoolcraft. The majority of the words were Ojibwa, with a few from the Dakota, Cree and Onondaga languages.

Though the majority of the Native American words included in the text accurately reflect pronunciation and definitions, some words appear incomplete. For example, the Ojibway words for "blueberry" are miin (plural: miinan) for the berries and miinagaawanzh (plural: miinagaawanzhiig) for the bush upon which the berries grow. Longfellow uses Meenah'ga, which appears to be a partial form for the bush, but he uses the word to mean the berry. Critics believe such mistakes are likely attributable to Schoolcraft (who was often careless about details) or to what always happens when someone who does not understand the nuances of a language and its grammar tries to use select words out of context.

=== Inspiration from Kalevala ===
The Song of Hiawatha was written in trochaic tetrameter, the same meter as Kalevala, the Finnish epic compiled by Elias Lönnrot from fragments of folk poetry. Longfellow had learned some of the Finnish language while spending a summer in Sweden in 1835. It is likely that he, 20 years later, had forgotten most of what he had learned of that language and referred to a German translation of the Kalevala by Franz Anton Schiefner. Trochee is a rhythm natural to the Finnish language—inasmuch as Finnish words are normally accented on the first syllable—to the same extent that iamb is natural to English. Longfellow's use of trochaic tetrameter for his poem has an artificiality that the Kalevala does not have in its own language.

He was not the first American poet to use the trochaic (or tetrameter) in writing Indian romances. Schoolcraft had written a romantic poem, Alhalla, or the Lord of Talladega (1843) in trochaic tetrameter, about which he comments in the preface:

The meter is thought to be not ill adapted to the Indian mode of enunciation. Nothing is more characteristic of their harangues and public speeches, than the vehement yet broken and continued strain of utterance, which would be subject to the charge of monotony, were it not varied by the extraordinary compass in the stress of voice, broken by the repetition of high and low accent, and often terminated with an exclamatory vigor, which is sometimes startling. It is not the less in accordance with these traits that nearly every initial syllable of the measure chosen is under accent. This at least may be affirmed, that it imparts a movement to the narrative, which, at the same time that it obviates languor, favors that repetitious rhythm, or pseudo-parallelism, which so strongly marks their highly compound lexicography.

Longfellow writes to his friend Ferdinand Freiligrath (who had introduced him to Finnische Runen in 1842) about Freiligrath's article, "The Measure of Hiawatha" in the prominent London magazine, Athenaeum (December 25, 1855): "Your article ... needs only one paragraph more to make it complete, and that is the statement that parallelism belongs to Indian poetry as well to Finnish ... And this is my justification for adapting it in Hiawatha." Trochaic is not a correct descriptor for Ojibwe oratory, song, or storytelling, but Schoolcraft was writing long before the study of Native American linguistics had come of age. Parallelism is an important part of Ojibwe language artistry.

== Cultural response ==
=== Reception and influence ===
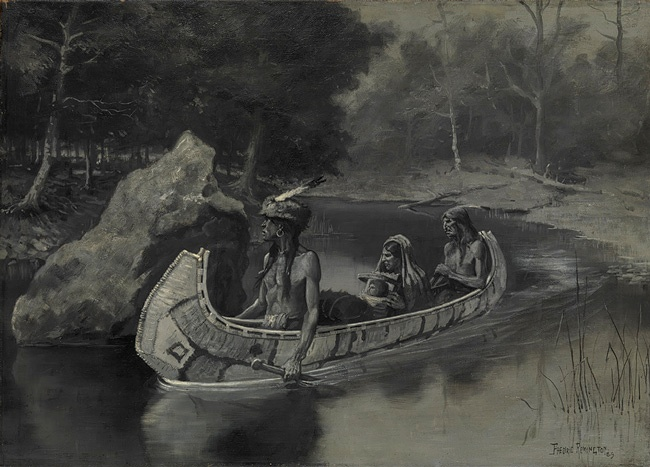
Hiawatha's Friends, an 1889 illustration by Frederic Remington dedicated to the poem

In August 1855, The New York Times carried an item on "Longfellow's New Poem", quoting an article from another periodical which says it "is very original, and has the simplicity and charm of a Saga ... it is the very antipodes of Alfred Lord Tennyson's Maud, which is ... morbid, irreligious, and painful."

In October 1855, The New York Times notes "Longfellow's Song of Hiawatha is nearly printed, and will soon appear." By November its column, "Gossip: What has been most Talked About during the Week", observes "The madness of the hour takes the metrical shape of trochees, everybody writes trochaics, talks trochaics, and think [sic] in trochees: ...

"By the way, the rise in Erie
Makes the bears as cross as thunder."
"Yes sir-ree! And Jacob's losses,
I've been told, are quite enormous ..."

The New York Times review of The Song of Hiawatha is scathing. The anonymous reviewer judges the poem "is entitled to commendation" for "embalming pleasantly enough the monstrous traditions of an uninteresting, and, one may almost say, a justly exterminated race. As a poem, it deserves no place" because there "is no romance about the Indian." He complains that Hiawatha's deeds of magical strength pale by comparison to the feats of Hercules and to "Finn Mac Cool, that big stupid Celtic mammoth." The reviewer writes "Grotesque, absurd, and savage as the groundwork is, Mr. Longfellow has woven over it a profuse wreath of his own poetic elegancies." He concludes Hiawatha "will never add to Mr. Longfellow's reputation as a poet."

In reaction to what he viewed as "spiteful and offensive" attacks on the poem, critic John Neal in the State of Maine on November 27, 1855, praises "this strange, beautiful poem" as "a fountain overflowing night and day with natural rhythm." He argues the poem was evidence that "Longfellow's music is getting to be his own—and there are those about him who will not allow others to misunderstand or misrepresent its character."

Thomas Conrad Porter, a professor at Franklin and Marshall College, believed that Longfellow had been inspired by more than the metrics of the Kalevala. He claimes The Song of Hiawatha is "Plagiarism" in the Washington National Intelligencer of November 27, 1855. Longfellow wrote to his friend Charles Sumner a few days later, stating: "As to having 'taken many of the most striking incidents of the Finnish Epic and transferred them to the American Indians'—it is absurd". Longfellow also insists "I know the Kalevala very well, and that some of its legends resemble the Indian stories preserved by Schoolcraft is very true. But the idea of making me responsible for that is too ludicrous." Later scholars continued to debate the extent to which The Song of Hiawatha borrowed its themes, episodes, and outline from the Kalevala.

Despite the critics, the poem was immediately popular with readers and continued so for many decades. The Grolier Club named The Song of Hiawatha the most influential book of 1855. Lydia Sigourney was inspired by the book to write a similar epic poem on Pocahontas, though she never completed it. English writer George Eliot calls The Song of Hiawatha (along with Nathaniel Hawthorne's 1850 book The Scarlet Letter) the "two most indigenous and masterly productions in American literature".

In the early 20th century, Longfellow's tale was adapted into books for young readers. W. T. Stead's "Books for the Bairns" series published The Story of Hiawatha, Re-Told in Prose by Queenie Scott-Hopper (1905). Prolific English illustrator Alice B. Woodward contributed to the 1930 publication of a prose version of The Story of Hiawatha by Florence Shaw. Allen Chaffee and Armstrong Sperry adapted the story for a Random House prose edition in 1951.

=== Music ===
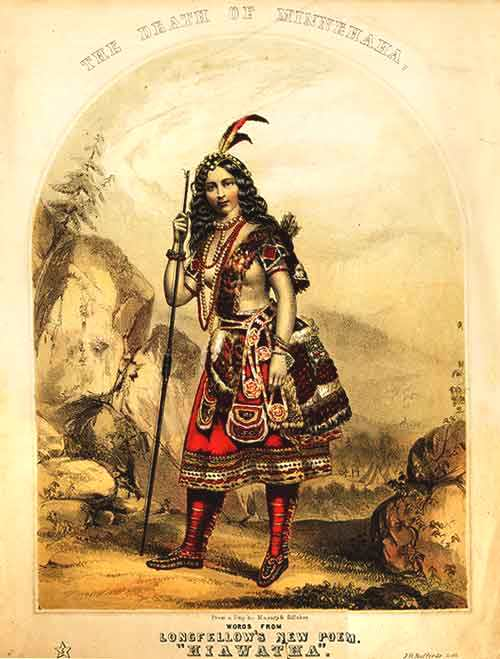
John Henry Bufford's 1856 cover for "The Death of Minnehaha"

The poem was taken as the first American epic to be composed of North American materials and free of European literary models. Earlier attempts to write a national epic, such as The Columbiad of Richard Snowden, ‘a poem on the American war’ published in 1795, or Joel Barlow's Vision of Columbus (1787) (rewritten and entitled The Columbiad in 1807), were considered derivative. Longfellow provided something entirely new: a vision of the continent's pre-European civilization in a metre adapted from a Finnish, non-Indo-European source.

Soon after the poem's publication, composers competed to set it to music. One of the first to tackle the poem was Emile Karst, whose cantata Hiawatha (1858) freely adapts and arranges texts of the poem. It was followed by Robert Stoepel's Hiawatha: An Indian Symphony, a work in 14 movements that combines narration, solo arias, descriptive choruses and programmatic orchestral interludes. The composer consulted with Longfellow, who approved the work before its premiere in 1859, but despite early success it was soon forgotten. Another major musical adaptation was the five-movement instrumental Hiawatha Symphony, Op. 31, by Ellsworth C. Phelps, whose final two movements were reviewed in the Brooklyn Daily Eagle on October 18, 1873. The work premiered May 10, 1879, at New York's Academy of Music, performed by the New York Philharmonic under the direction of Theodore Thomas. American composer Bessie Marshall Whitely composed an opera, Hiawatha's Childhood, based on the poem.

The poem influenced two European composers who spent a few years in the US. Frederick Delius completed his tone poem Hiawatha in 1888 and inscribed on the title page the passage beginning "Ye who love the haunts of Nature" from near the start of the poem. The work was not performed at the time, and the score was revised and recorded in 2009. Antonín Dvořák's Symphony No. 9, From the New World (1893) is inspired by Longfellow's poem. In an article published in The New York Herald on December 15, 1893, he says that the second movement of his work was a "sketch or study for a later work, either a cantata or opera ... which will be based upon Longfellow's Hiawatha" (with which he was familiar in Czech translation), and that the third movement scherzo is "suggested by the scene at the feast in Hiawatha where the Indians dance". African-American melodies also appear in the symphony, thanks to Dvořák's student Harry Burleigh, who used to sing him songs from the plantations. The fact that Burleigh's grandmother was part Indian has been suggested to explain why Dvořák came to equate Indian with African American music in his pronouncements to the press.

Among later orchestral treatments of the Hiawatha theme by American composers there was Louis Coerne's four-part symphonic suite, each section of which is prefaced by a quotation from the poem. This had a Munich premiere in 1893 and a Boston performance in 1894. Dvořák's student Rubin Goldmark followed with a Hiawatha Overture in 1896 and in 1901 there were performances of Hugo Kaun's symphonic poems "Minnehaha" and "Hiawatha". There were also additional settings of Longfellow's words. Arthur Foote's "The Farewell of Hiawatha" (Op. 11, 1886) was dedicated to the Apollo Club of Boston, the male voice group that gave its first performance. In 1897 Frederick Russell Burton completed his dramatic cantata Hiawatha. At the same time he wrote "Hiawatha's Death Song", subtitled 'Song of the Ojibways', which sets native words followed by an English translation by another writer.

Early 20th century British composer Hope Squire wrote several songs based on verses of Hiawatha. Mary Montgomery Koppel incorporates Ojibwe flute music for her setting of "The Death of Minnehaha" (2013) for two voices with piano and flute accompaniment.

The most celebrated setting of Longfellow's story was the cantata trilogy, The Song of Hiawatha (1898–1900), by the English composer Samuel Coleridge-Taylor. The first part, "Hiawatha's Wedding Feast" (Op. 30, No. 1), based on cantos 11–12 of the poem, was particularly famous for well over 50 years, receiving thousands of performances in the UK, US, Canada, New Zealand and South Africa. Though it slipped from popularity in the late 20th century, revival performances continue. The initial work was followed by two additional oratorios which were equally popular: The Death of Minnehaha (Op. 30, No. 2), based on canto 20, and Hiawatha's Departure (Op. 30, No. 4), based on cantos 21–22.

More popular settings followed publication of the poem. The first was Charles Crozat Converse's "The Death of Minnehaha", published in Boston around 1856. The hand-colored lithograph on the cover of the printed song, by John Henry Bufford, is now much sought after. The next popular tune, originally titled "Hiawatha (A Summer Idyl)", was not inspired by the poem. It was composed by Charles Daniels (under the pseudonym Neil Moret) while on the train to Hiawatha, Kansas, in 1901 and was inspired by the rhythm of the wheels on the rails. James O'Dea added lyrics in 1903, and the music was subtitled "His Song to Minnehaha". Later treated as a rag, it became a jazz standard.

Duke Ellington incorporated treatments of Hiawatha and Minnehaha in his jazz suite The Beautiful Indians (1946–47). Other popular songs have included "Hiawatha's Melody of Love", by George W. Meyer, with words by Alfred Bryan and Artie Mehlinger (1908), and Al Bowlly's "Hiawatha's Lullaby" (1933).

Modern composers have written works with the Hiawatha theme for young performers. They include the English musician Stanley Wilson's "Hiawatha, 12 Scenes" (1928) for first-grade solo piano, based on Longfellow's lines, and Soon Hee Newbold's rhythmic composition for strings in Dorian mode (2003), which is frequently performed by youth orchestras. The story of Hiawatha was dramatized by Tale Spinners for Children with Jordan Malek.

Some performers have incorporated excerpts from the poem into their musical work. Johnny Cash used a modified version of "Hiawatha's Vision“ as the opening piece on Johnny Cash Sings the Ballads of the True West (1965). Mike Oldfield used the sections "Hiawatha's Departure" and "The Son of the Evening Star" in the second part of his Incantations album (1978), rearranging some words to conform more to his music. Laurie Anderson used parts of the poem's third section at the beginning and end of the final piece of her Strange Angels album (1989).

=== Artistic use ===
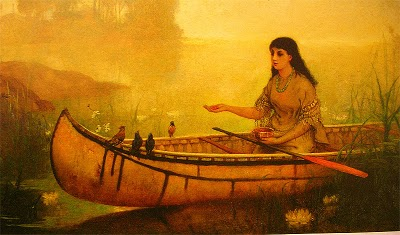
Minnehaha Feeding Birds by Frances Anne Hopkins, c. 1880

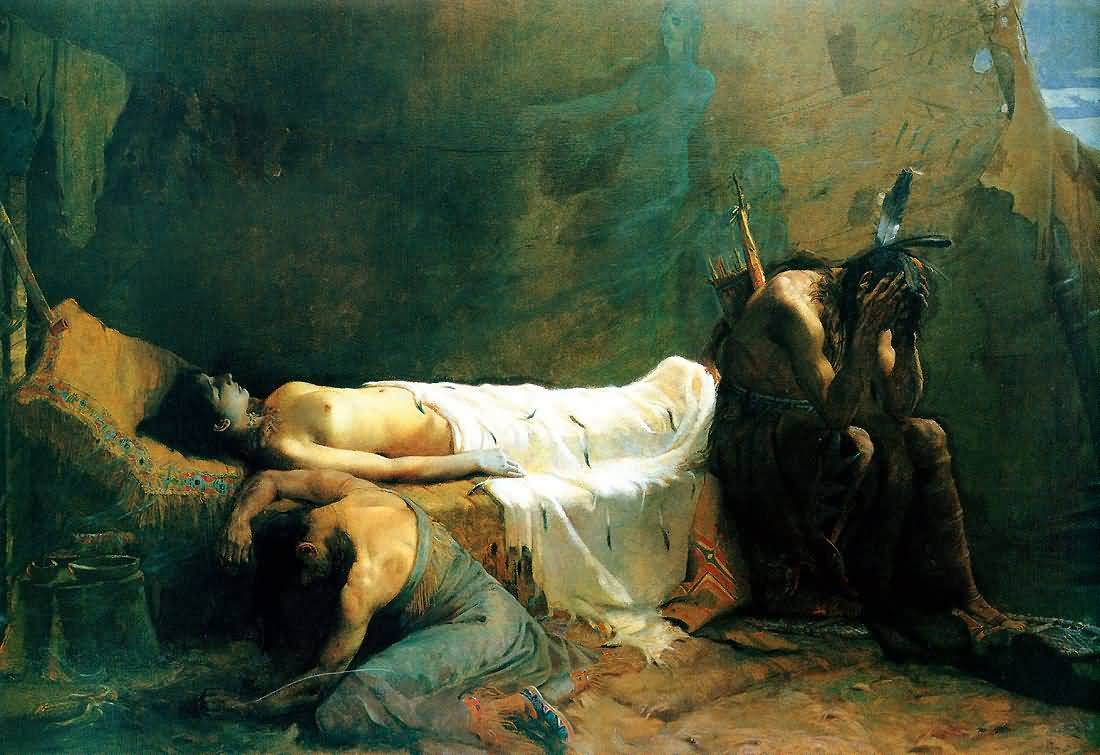
Death of Minnehaha by William de Leftwich Dodge in 1885

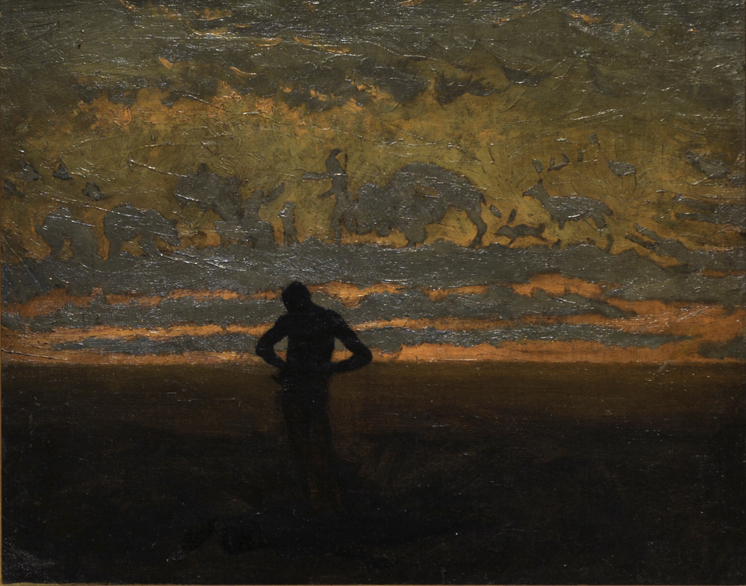
Hiawatha by Eakins in 1874

Numerous artists responded to the epic. The earliest pieces of sculpture were by Edmonia Lewis, whose father was Haitian and her mother Native American and African American. The arrow-maker and his daughter, later called The Wooing of Hiawatha, was modeled in 1866 and carved in 1872. In 1872 Lewis carved The Marriage of Hiawatha in marble, a work purchased in 2010 by the Kalamazoo Institute of Arts. Lewis's Hiawatha works remain notable not just because of her talented execution, but because of the rare insight within the pieces that comes from the artist being of Native American descent. Other 19th century sculptors inspired by the epic were Augustus Saint-Gaudens, whose marble statue of the seated Hiawatha (1874) is held by the Metropolitan Museum of Art; and Jacob Fjelde, who created a bronze statue, Hiawatha carrying Minnehaha, for the Columbian Exposition in 1893. It was installed in Minnehaha Park, Minneapolis, in 1912.

In the 20th century Marshall Fredericks created a small bronze Hiawatha (1938), now installed in the Michigan University Centre; a limestone statue (1949), also at the University of Michigan; and a relief installed at the Birmingham Covington School, Bloomfield Hills, Michigan.

Early paintings were by artists who concentrated on authentic American Native subjects. Eastman Johnson's pastel of Minnehaha seated by a stream (1857) was drawn directly from an Ojibwe model. English artist Frances Anne Hopkins traveled in the hunting country of Canada and used her sketches from the trip when she returned to her studio in England in 1870. She painted her Minnehaha Feeding Birds about 1880. Critics have thought these two artists had a sentimental approach, as did Émile Vernet-Lecomte in his 1871 painting of Minnehaha, making her a native child of the wild. The kinship of the latter is with other kitsch images, such as Bufford's cover for "The Death of Minnehaha" or those of the 1920s calendar painters James Arthur and Rudolph F. Ingerle.

American landscape painters referred to the poem to add an epic dimension to their patriotic celebration of the wonders of the national landscape. Albert Bierstadt presented his sunset piece, The Departure of Hiawatha, to Longfellow in 1868 when the poet was in England to receive an honorary degree at the University of Cambridge. Other examples include Thomas Moran's Fiercely the Red Sun Descending, Burned His Way along the Heavens (1875) and the panoramic waterfalls of Hiawatha and Minnehaha on their Honeymoon (1885) by Jerome Thompson. Thomas Eakins made his Hiawatha (c. 1874) a visionary statement superimposed on the fading light of the sky.

Toward the end of the 19th century, artists deliberately emphasized the epic qualities of the poem, as in William de Leftwich Dodge's Death of Minnehaha (1885). Frederic Remington demonstrated a similar quality in his series of 22 grisailles painted in oil for the 1890 deluxe photogravure edition of The Song of Hiawatha. One of the editions is owned by the Metropolitan Museum of Art. Dora Wheeler's Minnehaha listening to the waterfall (1884) design for a needle-woven tapestry was made by the Associated Artists for the Cornelius Vanderbilt house. The monumental quality survives into the 20th century in Frances Foy's Hiawatha returning with Minnehaha (1937), a mural sponsored during the Great Depression for the post office in Gibson City, Illinois.

=== Film ===
In 1901 and 1902, Charles and Katharine Bowden took still and moving images of the play that the Anishinaabe descendants of Schoolcraft's informant, Chief Shingwauk, staged in Debarats, Ontario, on a regular schedule from June through August starting in 1900. Katharine used this film in a program she performed on the Lyceum and Chautauqua circuits between 1903 and 1910. Some portions of the Bowden film have been restored and digitized by the Chicago Film Archives. Simultaneously, Canadian Joe Rosenthal shot a 15-minute film, Hiawatha, the Messiah of the Ojibway. Released in 1903, the footage has not been found, but publicity stills of the film suggest it was based on the same cast of Ojibwe actors at Debarats as the Bowden film.

William V. Ranous directed a one-reel version with a non-native cast in 1909. Producer Carl Laemmle followed up the film with a sequel in 1910 titled "The Death of Minnehaha." In 1913, Edgar Lewis directed Hiawatha, the first feature film to cast Native Americans in leading roles. Seneca actor and artist Jesse Cornplanter stars as Hiawatha, and Soon-goot, a 17-year-old Native American, portrays Minnehaha.

The 1952 film Hiawatha, directed by Kurt Neumann, cast non-Native actors in the leading roles. Vince Edwards was cast in the role of Hiawatha, and Yvette Duguay was cast as Minnehaha. The 1997 film The Song of Hiawatha, directed by Jeffrey Shore, stars Cherokee actor Litefoot as Hiawatha, Iñupiat and Cree (Métis) actress Irene Bedard as Minnehaha, and Oneida actor Graham Greene as O Kagh. Saulteaux Anishinaabe actor Adam Beach plays Chibiabos.

=== In popular culture ===
In the 1979 "Family" sketch "Carl's Grave" on Carol Burnett & Company, the character of Eunice, portrayed by Burnett, at the insistence of her Mama, Thelma Harper, portrayed by American actress Vicki Lawrence, begins a recitation of Hiawatha she learned as a child while at her father's grave.

=== Parodies ===
Parodies of the "Song of Hiawatha" (and especially its couplet, "By the shores of Gitche Gumee / By the shining Big-Sea-Water") emerged immediately on its publication. The New York Times even reviewed one such parody four days before reviewing Longfellow's original poem. This was Pocahontas: or the Gentle Savage, a comic extravaganza which included extracts from an imaginary Viking poem, "burlesquing the recent parodies, good, bad, and indifferent, on The Song of Hiawatha." The Times quotes:

Whence this song of Pocahontas,
With its flavor of tobacco,
And the stincweed [sic] Old Mundungus,
With the ocho of the Breakdown,
With its smack of Bourbonwhiskey,
With the twangle of the Banjo,
Of the Banjo—the Goatskinner,
And the Fiddle—the Catgutto...

In 1856 there appeared a 94-page parody, The Song of Milkanwatha: Translated from the Original Feejee. Probably the work of Rev. George A. Strong, it was ascribed on the title page to "Marc Antony Henderson" and to the publishers "Tickell and Grinne". The work following the original chapter by chapter and one passage later became famous:

In one hand Peek-Week, the squirrel,
in the other hand the blow-gun—
Fearful instrument, the blow-gun;
And Marcosset and Sumpunkin,
Kissed him, 'cause he killed the squirrel,
'Cause it was a rather big one.
From the squirrel-skin, Marcosset
Made some mittens for our hero,
Mittens with the fur-side inside,
With the fur-side next his fingers
So's to keep the hand warm inside;
That was why she put the fur-side—
Why she put the fur-side, inside.

Over time, an elaborated version stand-alone version developed, titled "The Modern Hiawatha":

When he killed the Mudjokivis,
Of the skin he made him mittens,
Made them with the fur side inside,
Made them with the skin side outside.
He, to get the warm side inside,
Put the inside skin side outside;
He, to get the cold side outside,
Put the warm side fur side inside.
That's why he put the fur side inside,
Why he put the skin side outside,
Why he turned them inside outside.

At Wallack's Theatre in New York a parody titled Hiawatha; or, Ardent Spirits and Laughing Water, by Charles Melton Walcot, premiered on December 26, 1856. In England, Lewis Carroll published Hiawatha's Photographing (1857), which he introduced by noting (in the same rhythm as the Longfellow poem), "In an age of imitation, I can claim no special merit for this slight attempt at doing what is known to be so easy. Any fairly practised writer, with the slightest ear for rhythm, could compose, for hours together, in the easy running metre of The Song of Hiawatha. Having then distinctly stated that I challenge no attention in the following little poem to its merely verbal jingle, I must beg the candid reader to confine his criticism to its treatment of the subject." A poem of some 200 lines, it describes Hiawatha's attempts to photograph the members of a pretentious middle-class family ending in disaster.

From his shoulder Hiawatha
Took the camera of rosewood,
Made of sliding, folding rosewood;
Neatly put it all together.
In its case it lay compactly,
Folded into nearly nothing;
But he opened out the hinges
Till it looked all squares and oblongs,
Like a complicated figure
In the Second Book of Euclid.

James Linen's 1865 San Francisco (in imitation of Hiawatha) states:

Anent oak-wooded Contra Costa,
Built on hills, stands San Francisco;
Built on tall piles Oregonian,
Deeply sunk in mud terraqueous,
Where the crabs, fat and stupendous,
Once in all their glory revelled;
And where other tribes testaceous
Felt secure in Neptune's kingdom;
Where sea-sharks, with jaws terrific,
Fled from land-sharks of the Orient;
Not far from the great Pacific,
Snug within the Gate called Golden,
By the Hill called Telegraph,
Near the Mission of Dolores,
Close by the Valley of St. Ann's,
San Francisco rears its mansions,
Rears its palaces and churches;
Built of timber, bricks, and mortar,
Built on hills and built in valleys,
Built in Beelzebubbian splendor,
Stands the city San Francisco.

During World War I, Owen Rutter, a British officer of the Army of the Orient, wrote Tiadatha, describing the city of Salonica, where several hundred thousand soldiers were stationed on the Macedonian Front in 1916–1918:

Tiadatha thought of Kipling,
Wondered if he's ever been there
Thought: "At least in Rue Egnatia
East and West are met together."
There were trams and Turkish beggars,
Mosques and minarets and churches,
Turkish baths and dirty cafés,
Picture palaces and kan-kans:
Daimler cars and Leyland lorries
Barging into buffalo wagons,
French and English private soldiers
Jostling seedy Eastern brigands.

In 1926, cartoonist Milt Gross published Hiawatta witt No Odder Poems, a Yiddish-English parody with comic illustrations. It begins:

On de shurrs from Geetchy Goony,
Stoot a tipee witt a weegwom
Frontage feefty fitt it mashered
Hopen fireplaze–izzy payments

"Hakawatha" (1989), by British computer scientist Mike Shields, writing under the pen name F. X. Reid, is about a frustrated computer programmer:

First, he sat and faced the console / Faced the glowing, humming console
Typed his login at the keyboard / Typed his password (fourteen letters)
Waited till the system answered / Waited long and cursed its slowness

The poem was also parodied in three cartoon shorts, all of which featured inept protagonists who are beset by comic calamities while hunting. The connection is made plain by the scenes being introduced by a mock-solemn intonation of lines from the poem. The most famous was the 1937 Silly Symphony Little Hiawatha, whose hero is a small boy whose pants keep falling down. The 1941 Warner Bros. cartoon Hiawatha's Rabbit Hunt features Bugs Bunny and a pint-sized version of Hiawatha in quest of rabbit stew. The 1944 MGM cartoon Big Heel-watha, directed by Tex Avery, follows the overweight title character's effort to win the hand of the chief's daughter by catching Screwy Squirrel. In his 1957 comic book adventure Land of the Pygmy Indians, American artist Carl Barks introduces a tribe of pint-sized Indigenous people north of Lake Superior (speaking in trochaic tetrameter, as in the original poem) who, for example, react to Uncle Scrooge McDuck's intrusion: "Flee, Peeweegahs, to the forest! / Flee the mighty, warlike strangers! / They have come to make great trouble / In the land of the Peeweegahs!" The December 1958 issue #43 of the magazine Mad, in its 'Trashery of Unknown Poetry', published a spoof called 'Hiya, Watha!' which ran in part: "At the Restaurant Nokomis / Way uptown on Forty-Second [42nd Street (Manhattan)], / Goes the shoe clerk Melvin Watha / Guzzles cola laced with bourbon / Doesn't pay the least attention / When the far more cheery drunkards / Call out gaily, 'Hiya, Watha!' / Keeps on boozing, grows more sullen / Falls across the bar unconscious."

== Citations ==
=== Sources ===
- Anon. (October 18, 1873). "Musical". The Brooklyn Daily Eagle. Vol. 34, no. 249. p. 5 – via newspapers.com. (also at fultonhistory.com
- Calhoun, Charles C. (2004). Longfellow: A Rediscovered Life. Boston: Beacon Press.
- Clements, William M. (1990). "Schoolcraft as Textmaker". Journal of American Folklore. 103 (408): 177–190. doi:10.2307/541854. JSTOR 541854.
- Irmscher, Christoph (2006). Longfellow redux. University of Illinois. ISBN 0-252-03063-X.
- Longfellow, Samuel, ed. (1886). Life of Henry Wadsworth Longfellow; with extracts from his journals and correspondence. Vol. II. Boston: Ticknor and Company.
- McVicker, Mary Frech (2016). Women Opera Composers: Biographies from the 1500s to the 21st Century. Jefferson, North Carolina: McFarland & Company. p. 242. ISBN 978-0-7864-9513-9. LCCN 2016014917.
- Moyne, Ernest John (1963). Hiawatha and Kalevala: A Study of the Relationship between Longfellow's 'Indian Edda' and the Finnish Epic. Folklore Fellows Communications. Vol. 192. Helsinki: Suomen Tiedeakatemia. ISSN 0014-5815.
- Nelson, Randy F. (1981). The Almanac of American Letters. Los Altos, California: William Kaufmann, Inc.
- Osborn, Chase S.; Osborn, Stellanova (1942). Schoolcraft—Longfellow—Hiawatha. Lancaster, Pennsylvania: The Jaques Cattell Press.
- Pearce, Roy Harvey (1965). The Savages of America: The Study of the Indian and the Idea of Civilization. Baltimore: Johns Hopkins University Press.
- Pisani, Michael Vincent (Spring 1998). "Hiawatha: Longfellow, Robert Stoepel, and an Early Musical Setting of Hiawatha (1859)". American Music. 16 (1): 45–85. doi:10.2307/3052675. JSTOR 3052675.
- Pisani, Michael Vincent (2008) [2005]. Imagining Native America in Music. Yale University. p. 130. ISBN 978-0-3001-0893-4. LCCN 2005019915.
- Richards, Irving T. (1933). The Life and Works of John Neal (PhD thesis). Harvard University. OCLC 7588473.
- Ross, Peter; Pelletreau, William Smith (1905). The History of Long Island, From Its Earliest Settlement to the Present Time. Vol. 3. New York and Chicago: Lewis Publishing Company – via Internet Archive.
- Schoolcraft, Henry Rowe (1851). Personal Memoirs of a Residence of Thirty Years with the Indian Tribes on the American Frontiers. Philadelphia: Lippincott, Grambo and Co.
- Schramm, Wilbur (1932). "Hiawatha and Its Predecessors". Philological Quarterly. 11: 321–343.
- Singer, Eliot A. (1988). ""Paul Bunyan and Hiawatha"". In Dewhurst, C. Kurt; Lockwood, Yvonne R. (eds.). Michigan Folklife Reader. East Lansing: Michigan State University Press.
- Steil, Mark (2005). Pipestone stages Longfellow's "Hiawatha". Minnesota Public Radio, 2005 July 22.
- Thompson, Stith (1922). The Indian legend of Hiawatha. Publications of the Modern Language Association of America. Vol. 37. pp. 128–140. OCLC 905969364.
- Thompson, Stith (1966) [1929]. Tales of the North American Indians. Bloomington: Indiana University Press.
- Williams, Mentor L., ed. (1991) [1956]. Schoolcraft's Indian Legends. East Lansing: Michigan State University Press.
