= French brig Sphinx (1813) =

French Sylphe-class brig

Sphynx
History

France
- Name: Sphinx
- Namesake: Sphinx
- Builder: Genoa (Constructeur: Mathurin Boucher)
- Laid down: February 1813
- Launched: 21 November 1813.
- Captured: 18 April 1814

United Kingdom
- Name: Sphynx
- Acquired: 18 April 1814 by capture
- Renamed: Regent c. 1815
- Fate: Sold 1824

Colombia
- Name: Victoria
- Namesake: Possibly Battle of La Victoria (1814)
- Acquired: Probably by purchase c. 1824
- Fate: Unknown

General characteristics
- Class & type: Sylphe-class brig
- Displacement: c.374 tons
- Sail plan: Brig
- Complement: 98 (French service)
- Armament: Sylphe class:14 × 24-pounder carronades + 2 × 8-pounder chase guns; British service:2 × 9-pounder + 2 × 6-pounder guns + 10 × 12-pounder carronades
- Notes: For dimensions see table below

Sphinx (or Sphynx), was a French Sylphe-class brig launched at Genoa in 1813. She was handed over to naval suppliers at Genoa on 17 April 1814, when nearly completed as part-payment for debts. The next day the British occupied Genoa. Sphinx appears to have become the Royal Navy brig Regent, and then a Customs and Excise cruizer. Regent was sold in 1824, and then appeared as the Colombian government vessel Victoria, which currently (May 2024), is no longer traceable in online resources after 1828.

== Design ==
A draught signed by Mathurin Boucher at Genoa on 20 January 1813, is for a brig with sixteen 24-pounder and two 8-pounder guns. Unfortunately, the draught does not provide dimensions. Sané signed the draught on 5 February 1813, and Decrès later approved it. This draught may have been used for Sphinx, but any differences from Sané's standard design for the Sylphe class were probably minor.

== Capture ==
Admiral Edward Pellew provided a list of the "Enemy's Ships and Vessels of War captured at Genoa, on the Surrender of the Fortress, 18th April 1814."

- Brilliant, of 74 guns, ready for launching.
- Coureur brig, of sixteen 24-pounders and two long 9-pounders.
- Renard brig, of fourteen 24-pounders and two long 9-pounders.
- Endymion brig, of fourteen 24-pounders and two long 8-pounders.
- Sphynx brig, of 18 guns, new, equipping.
- Unknown, of 74 guns, in frame.

The British completed Sphynx and put her under the command of Lieutenant Thomas Colby, who had been on Prince of Wales at the fall of Genoa. He then "returned to England in acting-command of the prize-brig Sphinx". On 17 May 1814, he was promoted to Commander.

Following the defeat of Napoleon in the spring of 1814, local elites encouraged by the British agent Lord William Bentinck proclaimed the restoration of the old Republic, but it was decided at the Congress of Vienna that Genoa should be given to the Kingdom of Sardinia. British troops suppressed the republic, and then left Genoa in December. Sardinia annexed Genoa on 3 January 1815.

== British career ==
From this point on the history of Sphinx becomes conjectural, highly plausible, but still conjectural as there are missing links. What ties the vessels together are names, launching in Genoa in 1813–4, similarity of dimensions, including a burthen of 350 to 359 tons (bm), number of guns, and description as a brig.

There was a British brig called Regent that the Royal Navy acquired in 1816. It is known that she was Italian-built, being captured on the stocks at Genoa when that port was taken in 1814. This vessel is probably Sphynx, which was the newest of the prizes, still equipping at the time of capture, and had sailed as a prize back to England. Colledge and the records of the National Maritime Museum (NMM) indicate that the Navy purchased Regent in 1816. Her purchase in 1816 would be consistent with the Navy purchasing Sphynx sometime after her arrival in England and then renaming her, the British East India Company having built, and launched in January 1815 for the Navy, a Cherokee-class brig-sloop named Sphinx.

It is not clear how long the Royal Navy retained Regent. Apparently the Navy transferred her to His Majesty's Customs for use as a revenue cruiser. She served on the North Sea station until 1821, and was then placed in reserve. The NMM simply lists her as "On revenue service" in 1821. (Note: Colledge reports that she continued in revenue service until 1831, but this is clearly wrong and probably represents a typo.)

In October 1824 the "Honourable the Commissioners of His Majesty's Customs" offered for sale on "Monday the 1st of November next, at two o'clock, in the afternoon precisely, at the King's Warehouse, Custom-House, the fine fast sailing brig Regent, Late in the service of the Customs on the Coast of Scotland, and now lying at the Commercial-Docks, where she may be viewed until the time of sale."

== Fate ==
Lloyd's Register for 1826 and 1827, listed the brig Victoria, 359 tons (bm), Genoa-built in 1814. Her master was Thomas, and her owner the Colombian Government. She was shown as sailing between London and New York. Victoria was no longer in the 1828 Lloyd's Register. Documents currently available on line do not indicate what became of her.

== Dimensions per alternative sources ==
| Dimension | French | NMM/Colledge | Customs (full) | Customs (at sale) | Other |
| Length overall | 29.23 m (95.9 ft) | 97 ft 0 in (29.6 m) | 102 ft 0 in (31.1 m) | 98 ft 4 in (30.0 m) | |
| Length ("p.o.d") | | | 97 ft 9 in (29.8 m) | | |
| Length (keel) | 26.31 m (86.3 ft) | | 80 ft 4 in (24.5 m) | | |
| Breadth | 8.45 m (27.7 ft) | 29 ft 0 in (8.8 m) | 29 ft 0 in (8.8 m) | 29 ft 3 in (8.9 m) | |
| Hold depth | 3.34 m (11.0 ft) | | 13 ft 0 in (4.0 m) | 12 ft 9 in (3.9 m) | |
| Draught (unladen) | 3.55 m (11.6 ft) (unloaded) | | | | |
| Tons burthen (bm) | | 350 | 359 44/94 | 351 89/94 | 359 (Lloyd's Register) |
All feet and inches are British measure
