= George Gordon, Lord Haddo =

Scottish Freemason

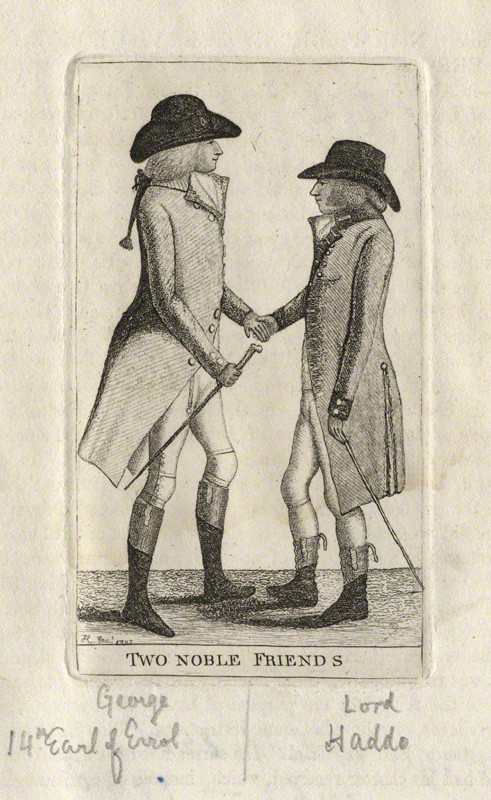
Lord Haddo (right) with George Hay, 16th Earl of Erroll

George Gordon, Lord Haddo (28 January 1764 – 2 October 1791) was a Scottish Freemason and the eldest son of George Gordon, 3rd Earl of Aberdeen.

On 18 June 1782, Haddo married Charlotte Baird (d. 8 October 1795) a sister of Sir David Baird, Bt.; they had seven children:

- Hon. George Hamilton-Gordon (1784–1860), later 4th Earl of Aberdeen and Prime Minister of the United Kingdom (1852–1855)
- Hon. William Gordon (1784–1858), politician and vice-admiral
- The Hon. Sir Alexander Gordon (1786–1815), lieutenant-colonel, killed at Waterloo
- Lady Alice Gordon (1787–1847), granted the rank of an earl's daughter in 1813, Lady-in-Waiting to Princess Sophia of Gloucester, died unmarried.
- Hon. Charles Gordon (1790–1835), soldier
- Hon. Sir Robert Gordon (1791–1847), diplomat
- Hon. Sir John Gordon (1792–1869), naval officer

Haddo was Grand Master of the Grand Lodge of Scotland from 1784 to 1786. In this capacity he laid the foundation stone of South Bridge, Edinburgh, on 1 August 1785.

He predeceased his father in 1791 and on the latter's death in 1801, the earldom passed to Haddo's eldest son, George.

== Legacy ==
Haddo Peak in the Canadian Rocky Mountains was named in his honour.

== Notes ==
Masonic offices
Preceded by The Earl of Buchan	Grand Master of the Grand Lodge of Scotland; 1784–1786	Succeeded by Lord Elcho
