= John Gordon (Royal Navy officer) =

Royal Navy officer

Admiral John Gordon (c. 1792 - 11 November 1869) was a Royal Navy officer and the son of George Gordon, Lord Haddo.

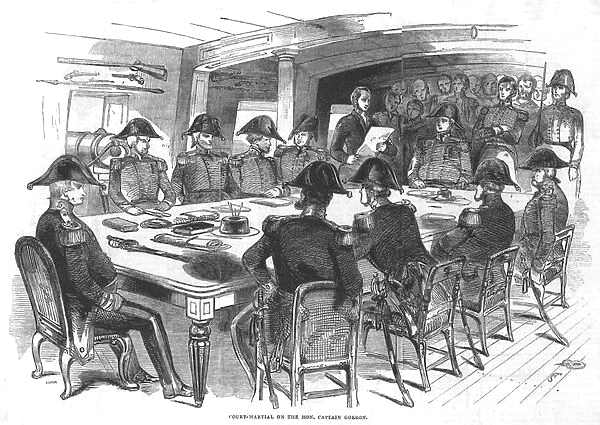
Court-Martial on the Honourable Captain Gordon on board HMS Victory. The Pictorial Times 1846

He captained HMS America in 1844–1845. There was an incident in which he left his station despite being ordered to stay, in order to take Mexican merchants' gold to England, after which he was court-martialled for disobeying orders and retired from active service. While on the retired list, he was promoted to rear-admiral in 1851, vice-admiral in 1858 and admiral in 1863.

Gordon Head in Saanich, Vancouver Island, Canada, is named after him.
