= French brig Renard (1810) =

Renard
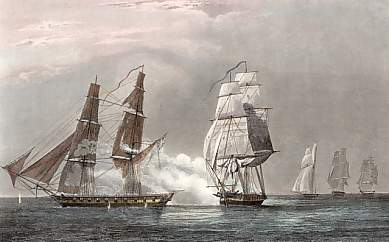
- Fight between Renard and HMS Swallow (drawing by Paris, engraving by Chabannes)

History

France
- Name: Renard
- Namesake: fox
- Builder: Genoa Dockyard
- Laid down: November 1808
- Launched: 12 May 1810
- Commissioned: 13 June 1810
- Fate: Seized by the British in 1814 with the capitulation of Genoa

General characteristics
- Class & type: Abeille-class brig
- Displacement: 350 ton (French)
- Length: 32 m (105 ft 0 in)
- Beam: 8.7 m (28 ft 7 in)
- Draught: 3.5 m (11 ft 6 in)
- Complement: 84
- Armament: 14 × 24-pounder carronades; 2 × 6-pounder chase guns
- Armour: Timber

Renard was an Abeille-class 16-gun brig of the French Navy, launched in 1810 in Genoa. She is known for her battle against the brig HMS Swallow, one of the early feats of then-Lieutenant Charles Baudin.

== Career ==
=== August 1810: battle with HMS Seahorse ===
In August 1809, Charles Baudin, recently promoted to lieutenant, was appointed to command Renard. On 22 August 1810, while cruising off Tuscany with the brig Ligurie, under Lieutenant Serra, Renard encountered the frigate HMS Seahorse. Renard, the better sailor of the two, allowed Seahorse to chase her while Ligurie sought her escape by sailing close to shore. After a while, Renard and Seahorse found themselves becalmed; when the wind returned, it was to favour Seahorse, and Renard narrowly avoided capture by catching a breeze and running into the Gulf of La Spezia, eventually beaching herself while a storm broke out. As good weather returned, so did Seahorse, and Renard had to endure her bombardment until the evening, although she did not sustain serious damage. Seahorse departed in the evening and Renard, refloated, limped back to Genoa. En route, Renard again met Seahorse, but sought refuge under the shore batteries of Levanto which, although in bad shape, proved sufficient to deter the frigate.

=== Operations in 1810–11 ===
During 1810 and 1811, Renard escorted convoys off Tuscany and Liguria, reaching as far as Corsica and Elbe. In July 1811, Renard sortied to intercept a British privateer. Renard used a false British flag to reduce the distance of her opponent, before the privateer realised the ruse and attempted to flee. Renard gave chase and, after a solid day of pursuit, overhauled her opponent which struck at her warning shot. She proved to be the 10-gun privateer Three Brothers, of Malta, with a crew of 100 men.

=== Operations in 1812 ===
In June 1812, Renard was part of the escort of a 33-ship convoy bound for Marseille. Soon after exiting Genoa, the convoy encountered a British squadron comprising the relatively new 74-gun HMS America, the 44-gun frigate Curacoa, and the 20-gun brig-sloop Swallow. The French forces amounted to Renard and the 6-gun schooner Goéland, under Lieutenant Saint-Belin. Recognising that Swallow, in the van of the British squadron, tended to sail at some distance from the America and Curacoa, Baudin sought an opportunity to isolate and capture her. He instructed Goéland to sail the convoy into the safety of Saint-Tropez. Then on 17 June, around noon, seizing a moment of favourable wind when Swallow was far in front of the main British forces, engaged her at close range. The brigs traded fire, with shots from Swallow quickly killing Ensign Charton and severely wounding Baudin, who nevertheless continued to direct the action. Meanwhile, Goéland attempted to assist Renard, but a cannonball took away her rudder and left her momentarily disabled. Soon afterwards, Swallow manoeuvered to rejoin her division, leaving the badly battered Renard, with 42 casualties, to reach Saint-Tropez.

== Fate ==
The British were eventually able to seize Renard at the capitulation of Genoa, on 19 April 1814. Admiral Edward Pellew provided a list of the "Enemy's Ships and Vessels of War captured at Genoa, on the Surrender of the Fortress, 18th April 1814."

- Brilliant, of 74 guns, ready for launching.
- Coureur brig, of 16 twenty-four-pounders and 2 long nine-pounders.
- Renard brig, of 14 twenty-four-pounders and 2 long nine-pounders.
- Endymion brig, of 14 twenty-four-pounders and 2 long eight-pounders.
- Sphynx brig, of 18 guns, new, equipping.
- Unknown, of 74 guns, in frame.
