= Hiawatha (painting) =

1874 oil painting by Thomas Eakins

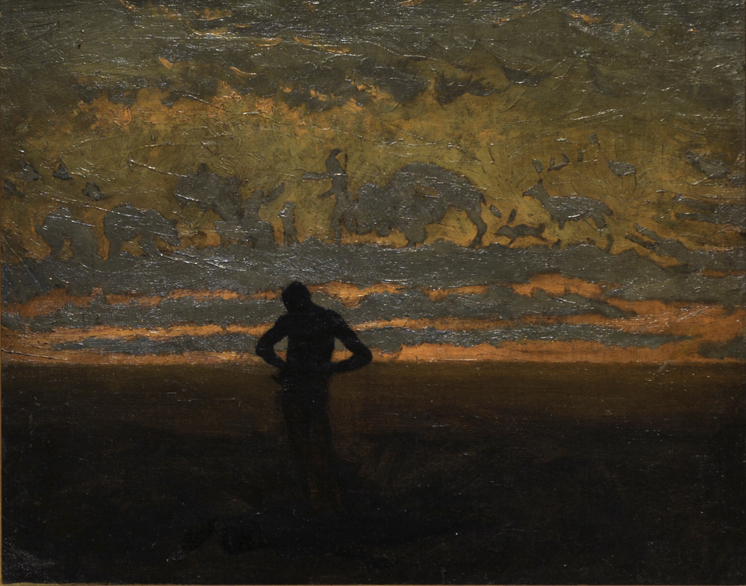
- Artist: Thomas Eakins
- Year: 1874
- Medium: Oil on canvas
- Movement: Romantic
- Location: Hirshhorn Museum and Sculpture Garden

Hiawatha is an 1874 oil-on-canvas painting by Thomas Eakins. It depicts the Native American leader Hiawatha in an impressionistic style, one of the only non-Realist paintings Eakins ever completed. It was inspired by Longfellow's 1855 epic poem The Song of Hiawatha.

The oil-on-canvas version shown here was a study for a larger watercolor piece that was ultimately accidentally destroyed in the 1940s.

== Description ==
The painting depicts a scene from Henry Wadsworth Longfellow's epic poem The Song of Hiawatha, "Hiawatha's Fasting" (Canto V), where the leader fasts and prays for a solution to end the starvation of his people.

Hiawatha, an Ojibwa Native American leader, can be seen standing in silhouette in front of a corn field. Various animal-shaped clouds can be seen in the sunset: a bear, buffalo, antelope, and turkey.

== Analysis ==
On the original watercolor painting, Eakins said:

It got so poetic at last that when Maggie would see it she would make as if it turned her stomach. I got so sick of it myself soon that I gave it up. I guess maybe my hair was getting too long for on having it cropped again I could not have been induced to finish it.

Eakins eventually began to loathe his Hiawatha paintings.
