= HMS America (1810) =

Vengeur-class ship of the line

- Line drawing of America

History

United Kingdom
- Name: America
- Ordered: 22 August 1807
- Builder: Perry, Wells & Green, Blackwall Yard
- Laid down: January 1808
- Launched: 21 April 1810
- Commissioned: April 1811
- Fate: Broken up, 6 February 1867

General characteristics (as built)
- Class & type: Vengeur-class ship of the line
- Tons burthen: 1,758 (bm)
- Length: 176 ft (53.6 m) (gundeck)
- Beam: 48 ft 6 in (14.8 m)
- Draught: 17 ft 8 in (5.4 m) (light)
- Depth of hold: 21 ft (6.4 m)
- Sail plan: Full-rigged ship
- Complement: 590
- Armament: 74 muzzle-loading, smoothbore guns; Gundeck: 28 × 32 pdr guns; Upper deck: 28 × 18 pdr guns; Quarterdeck: 4 × 12 pdr guns + 10 × 32 pdr carronades; Forecastle: 2 × 12 pdr guns + 2 × 32 pdr carronades

HMS America was a 74-gun third rate Vengeur-class ship of the line built for the Royal Navy in the first decade of the 19th century. Completed in 1811, she played a minor role in the Napoleonic Wars.

In 1812 she was part of a British squadron consisting of the frigate Curacoa, and Swallow when they intercepted a French convoy that had left Genoa on 11 June, heading for Toulon. The convoy consisted of 14 merchant vessels, several gunboats, and most importantly, the brig-corvette Renard, of 16 guns, under the command of Lieutenant de vaisseau Charles Baudin, and the schooner Goéland, of 12 guns, under the command of Enseigne de vaisseau Belin. The British on 15 June drove the French to take shelter at the Île Sainte-Marguerite. The next day Swallow came close to reconnoitre, the other two British ships having to hold off because of shallow water. Although the French escorts came out when they saw Swallow becalmed, they then turned back when the winds picked up and took their convoy to Fréjus. There the French escort vessels took on board some reinforcements and then turned to engage Swallow.

A sanguinary but inconclusive action ensued. Eventually, Swallow hauled off to rejoin the two larger British ships, which were coming up, while Renard and Goéland rejoined their convoy, now in the Bay of Grimaud. The action cost Swallow six men killed and 17 wounded, out of 109 men on board. Renard had a crew of 94, which had been doubled by the troops taken on at Fréjus. In all she lost 14 men killed and 28 wounded, including her captain, Lieutenant Baudin. Goéland had a crew of 113 men but her casualties are not known. She did not engage deeply in the battle, though she did exchange some fire with Swallow.

In 1827 America was cut down into a fourth rate.

During the rising tensions with the United States over the Oregon boundary dispute, HMS America was dispatched to the Pacific Northwest in 1845. Leaving the Straits of Juan de Fuca on 1 October, the vessel sailed for the Kingdom of Hawaii and later the Pacific Station at Valparaíso, Chile. While at the Pacific Station, Captain John Gordon ordered the valuable cargo of HMS Daphne be moved to his ship and departed to deliver it to the United Kingdom. For removing the second most powerful British vessel on the Pacific coast of the Americas during the Oregon crisis, Gordon was court-martialed and reprimanded.

America was broken up in 1867.
