= Hippolyte Lecomte =

French painter (1781–1857)

- Born: Hippolyte Lecomte; 28 December 1781
- Died: 26 July 1857 (aged 75)

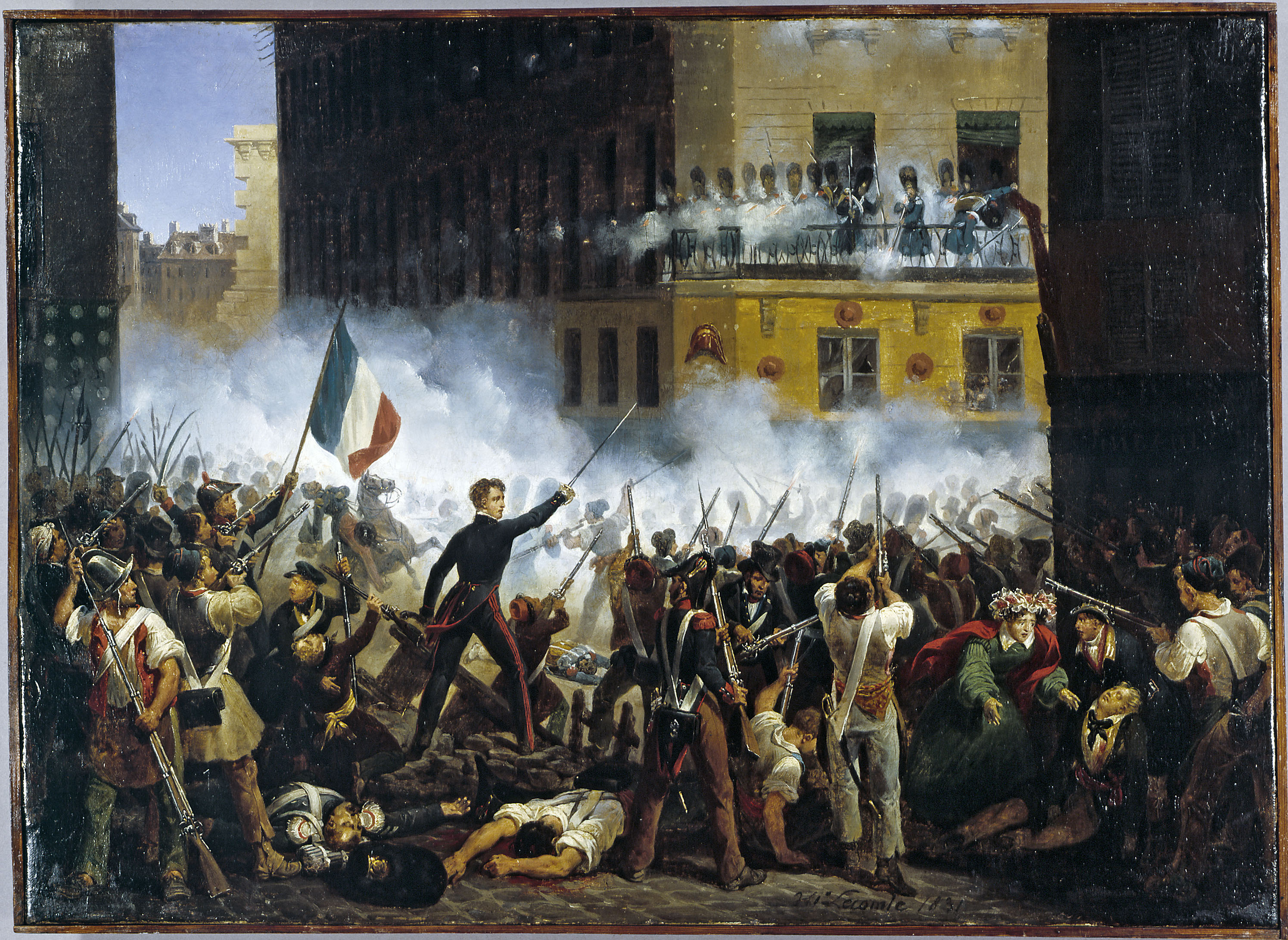
Rohan Road combat, 29 July 1830.

Hippolyte Lecomte (French pronunciation: [ipɔlit ləkɔ̃t]; 28 December 1781, Puiseaux – 25 July 1857, Paris) was a French painter best known for large scale historical paintings and ballet designs. His wife, born Camille Vernet, was the sister of the painter Émile Jean-Horace Vernet. His son, Émile Vernet-Lecomte, was also a noted painter. The caricaturist Jean Ignace Isidore Gérard, better known as "J.J. Grandville", worked in Lecomte's studio.

== Principal works ==
- Napoléon Ier se faisant présenter à Astorga des prisonniers anglais et ordonne de les traiter avec des soins particuliers, janvier 1809, 1810, Palace of Versailles
- Reddition de Mantoue, le 2 février 1797 : le général Wurmser se rend au général Sérurier, Salon de 1812, Palace of Versailles
- Episode de la guerre d'Espagne en 1823, prise des retranchements de Sainte-Marguerite devant la Corogne, le 5 juillet 1823 (le général Bourke donnant ses ordres au général La RocheJaquelein qui s'opposent au général Quiroga), 1828, Palace of Versailles
- Combat de Salo en Italie, 31 juillet 1796. Le général Guyeux assiégé, 1836, Château de Versailles, Palace of Versailles
- Bataille de Hochstaedt sur le Danube remportée par les généraux Moreau et Lecourbe sur l'armée autrichienne, 19 juin 1800, 1838, Palace of Versailles
- Combat de Mautern en Styrie, remporté par l'armée d'Italie commandée par le prince Eugène de Beauharnais, vice-roi d'Italie, sur les troupes autrichiennes du général Jellarich, 25 mai 1809, 1839, Palace of Versailles
- Combat dans les gorges du Tyrol, mars 1797, Palace of Versailles
- La bataille de Raab, 14 juin 1809, Palace of Versailles
- La prise de Stralsund, 20 août 1807, Palace of Versailles
- Le combat de Hollabrunn, 10 juillet 1809, Palace of Versailles
