= Charles Baudin =

French admiral

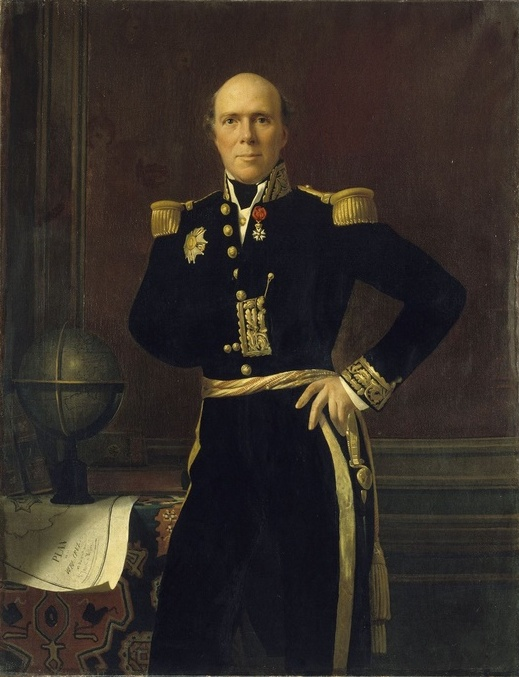
- Portrait by Émile Vernet-Lecomte
- Born: 21 July 1784; Sedan, Kingdom of France
- Died: 7 June 1854 (aged 69); Ischia, Kingdom of Sardinia
- Military career
- Allegiance: First French Empire; Kingdom of France; July Monarchy
- Branch: French Navy
- Service years: 1808–1848
- Rank: Admiral
- Conflicts: Pastry War; Battle of Lazzaroni
- Other work: Military attaché to Buenos Aires

Charles Baudin (French pronunciation: [ʃaʁl bodɛ̃]; 21 July 1784 – 7 June 1854), was a French admiral, whose naval service extended from the First Empire through the early days of the Second Empire.

== Biography ==
Charles Baudin was born on 21 July 1784 in Paris. His father was Pierre Charles Louis Baudin, a politician who became president of the National Convention.

From 1800 to 1803, Baudin served as a midshipman on Géographe and took part in her expedition to Australia.

Baudin then served in the West Indies on board the frigate Piémontaise and later the Sémillante, where he lost an arm in 1808 during her battle against HMS Terpsichore. In 1809, he became Lieutenant and Commander of the brig Renard, which escorted convoys of merchant vessels between Genoa and Toulon. In 1812, he received the order to convey 14 munitions-laden cargo vessels to Toulon. Although he was pursued by English cruisers, he was able to take his squadron safely to St. Tropez, notably engaging HMS Swallow on 11 June. In Toulon he was promoted to Captain. After the battle of Waterloo he was prepared to lead his defeated Emperor Napoleon I through the midst of the English cruisers; Napoleon, however, could not make up his mind in time.

After the Restoration, Baudin was forced into retirement, and in 1816 joined the merchant marine. Under the July Monarchy, he returned to military service and was promoted to Captain in 1834. In 1838, he became a Rear Admiral and became Commander-in-Chief of the squadron sent to Mexico during the so-called "Pastry War". In this conflict he commanded the French forces at the Battle of Veracruz on 27 November 1838, against the fort of Vera Cruz, San Juan de Ulúa. The fort gave itself up the next day.

In January 1839, Baudin was named a Vice Admiral and in the following year he was entrusted with a military and diplomatic mission to Buenos Aires. He also received command over the fleet in South American waters. In 1841, he took over the Ministry of Marine, but quickly resigned and became maritime prefect in Toulon.

In 1848, after the February Revolution, he became commander-in-chief of France's Mediterranean Fleet. In this position, he took part in the Battle of Lazzaroni and of troops against Naples, and then moved toward Sicily, where he was defeated by the forces of Carlo Filangieri.

In 1849, Baudin returned with his family to Ischia, where he died on 7 June 1854. Not long beforehand, he had been named a full Admiral.

== Notes, citations, and references ==
Notes

Citations

References

- Jurien de La Gravière, Jean Pierre Edmond (1888). L'Amiral Baudin (in French). Paris: Plon, Nourrit et Compagnie. (available from page 535 on this PDF file)
