= HMS Swallow (1805) =

Brig-sloop of the Royal Navy

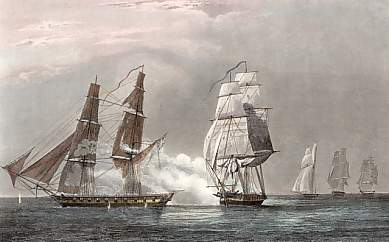
- Fight between Renard and HMS Swallow in 1812. Drawing by Paris, engraving by Chabannes.

History

United Kingdom
- Name: HMS Swallow
- Ordered: 27 November 1802
- Builder: Benjamin Tanner, Dartmouth
- Laid down: May 1804
- Launched: 24 December 1805
- Fate: Broken up November 1815

General characteristics
- Class & type: Cruizer-class brig-sloop
- Tons burthen: 386 50/94 (bm)
- Length: 100 ft 1 1/2 in (30.518 m) (gundeck); 77 ft 3 1/4 in (23.552 m) (keel)
- Beam: 30 ft 8 in (9.35 m)
- Depth of hold: 13 ft 0 in (3.96 m)
- Sail plan: Brig rigged
- Complement: 121
- Armament: 16 × 32-pounder carronades + 2 × 6-pounder bow guns

HMS Swallow was a Cruizer-class brig-sloop launched in December 1805, nine months late. She served the Royal Navy through the Napoleonic Wars, capturing numerous privateers. After the end of the wars she was broken up in 1815.

== Career ==
Commander Alexander Milner commissioned Swallow in March 1806. On 30 October 1807 Swallow was in company with Plover some seven leagues (34 km) northeast of Scilly when Plover captured the French privateer lugger Bohemienne. Bohemienne was armed with two guns and had a crew of 44, 16 of whom were away as prize crews. She had sailed from Saint Malo two weeks earlier and had captured four British merchant sloops, Hope, Favorite, and two others.

Then on 15 November Swallow captured another French two-gun privateer, Friedland, seven or eight leagues (34 or 39 km) south of The Lizard. Friedland had a crew of 41 men and had thrown her guns overboard during the chase. She was only a day out of Morlaix and had not captured anything.

On 14 June 1808 Swallow captured Diana. Some 18 months later, on 7 November 1809, Swallow sailed for the Mediterranean.

Swallow was under the command of Commander John Bedford on 19 April 1810 when she captured the French privateer Général Octavy. Général Octavy was armed with 12 guns and had a crew of 50 men.

On 14 June Cerberus was cruising in the Mediterranean in company with Active and Swallow. Together, the three British vessels captured three French gun-boats: Vincentina, Modanese and Elvetica (or Elvetria).

Swallow's next capture occurred on 7 June 1811, at which time she was under the command of Commander Edward Reynolds Sibly. (Note: At some point Bedford had lost a leg while captain of Swallow.) Euryalus and Swallow sent their boats in pursuit of a French privateer off Corsica. After a long chase the boats captured Intrepide, which had a crew of 58 and was armed with two 8-pounders. (Note: A first-class share of the prize money was worth £11 15s 6d; a sixth-class share, that of an ordinary seaman, was worth 2s 3 3/4d.)

A month and a half later, on 26 July, Swallow captured the privateer Belle Genoise off Sicily. Belle Genoise was armed with two guns and had a crew of 37 men.

In 1812 Swallow was under E. R. Sibly's command when a British squadron consisting of the 74-gun third-rate America, the frigate Curacoa, and Swallow intercepted a French convoy that had left Genoa on 11 June, heading for Toulon. The convoy consisted of 14 merchant vessels, several gunboats, and most importantly, the brig-corvette Renard, of 16 guns, under the command of Lieutenant de vaisseau Charles Baudin, and the schooner Goéland, of 12 guns, under the command of Enseigne de vaisseau Belin. The British on 15 June drove the French to take shelter at the Île Sainte-Marguerite. The next day Swallow came close to reconnoitre, the other two British ships having to hold off because of shallow water. Although the French escorts came out when they saw Swallow becalmed, they then turned back when the winds picked up and took their convoy to Fréjus. There the French escort vessels took on board some reinforcements and then turned to engage Swallow.

A sanguine but inconclusive action ensued. Eventually, Swallow hauled off to rejoin the two larger British ships, which were coming up, while Renard and Goéland rejoined their convoy, now in the Bay of Grimaud. The action cost Swallow six men killed and 17 wounded, out of 109 men on board. Renard had a crew of 94, which had been doubled by the troops taken on at Fréjus. In all she lost 14 men killed and 28 wounded, including her captain, Lieutenant Baudin. Goéland had a crew of 113 men but her casualties are not known. She did not engage deeply in the battle, though she did exchange some fire with Swallow.

Later the same month Swallow came under the temporary command of Commander Benjamin Crispin and then under that of Lieutenant George Canning (acting), in June. E. R. Sibly had transferred to Blossom, but was superseded and returned to Swallow.

On 31 August 1813, Imperieuse and Swallow captured the French privateer Audacieuse off the Strait of Bonifacio. Audacieuse was armed with three guns and carried a crew of 40 men. She was two days out of Civitavecchia.

Sibly and Swallow were involved in another notable action on 16 September 1813. Swallow observed a French brig and a xebec close inshore between herself and the port of D'Anzo. He sent in three boats which were able to bring out the brig Guerriere, of four guns. Guerrier was carrying 60 stands of small arms. The cutting out expedition cost Swallow two men killed and four wounded.

On 5 October Swallow joined a British squadron off D'Anzo. The squadron consisted of the 74-gun Edinburgh, the two frigates Imperieuse and Resistance, and the sloops Eclair, Pylades, and Swallow. The ships deployed against the port's defenses, Swallow engaging a tower of one gun, while a cutting out party of seamen and marines went in and brought out 29 vessels. The British suffered no casualties in the attack.

Sibly received a promotion to post captain on 8 March 1814. Commander Lord Algernon Percy replaced Sibly in command of Swallow. She was then part of the squadron that captured Lerici and the fortress of Santa Maria at the end of March, and Genoa on 19 April. Among the vessels captured at Genoa was the brig Renard, of fourteen 24-pounder guns and two long 9-pounder guns. (Note: A first-class share of the prize money for Genoa was worth £538 5s 2 3/4d; a sixth-class share, that of an ordinary seaman, was worth £3 12s 4d. In a later, second payment, a first-class share was worth £169 2s 8d, while a sixth-class share was worth £1 2s 8 1/4d. In a third payment, a first-class share of the prize money was worth £69 6s 1d; a sixth-class share, that of an ordinary seaman, was worth 9s 4d.) In May Captain Edwin James replaced Percy.

== Fate ==
In February 1815 the "Principal Officers and Commissioners of His Majesty's Navy" offered Swallow for sale at Chatham. She was broken up there in November 1815.
