= Émile Vernet-Lecomte =

French painter

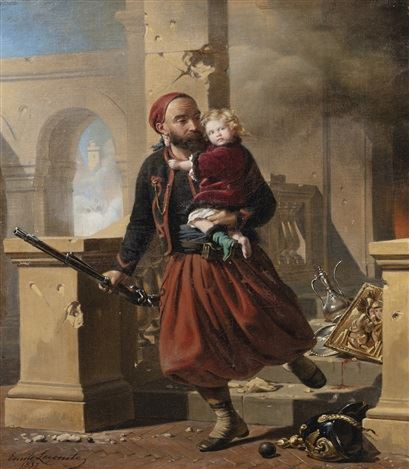
Zouave Saving a Child from a Burning Church

Émile Vernet-Lecomte (French pronunciation: [emil vɛʁnɛ ləkɔ̃t]), born Charles Émile Hippolyte Lecomte (15 March 1821, Paris - 19 November 1900, Paris) was a French painter; best known for his Orientalist works.

== Biography ==
He came from a family of illustrious painters. His great-grandfather was Claude Joseph Vernet and his father was the battle painter, Hippolyte Lecomte; who was himself the son-in-law of Carle Vernet, and the nephew of Horace Vernet.

The last named was one of his teachers; along with Léon Cogniet. He began by painting portraits of the aristocracy and the wealthy bourgeoisie. His first exhibition at the Salon took place at the Salon of 1843, and he was awarded a bronze medal. After that, he signed his paintings as "Vernet-Lecomte".

He soon developed a taste for Orientalism. His first works in that genre were exhibited at the Salon of 1847; including numerous portraits of Middle Eastern women. Current events were not ignored, however, and he followed in father's footsteps by creating works depicting the Crimean War, and the slaughter of the Maronites by the Druze, during the 1860 Mount Lebanon civil war.

His works may be seen at the Musée municipal de La Roche-sur-Yon and the Musée Calvet.

== Gallery ==
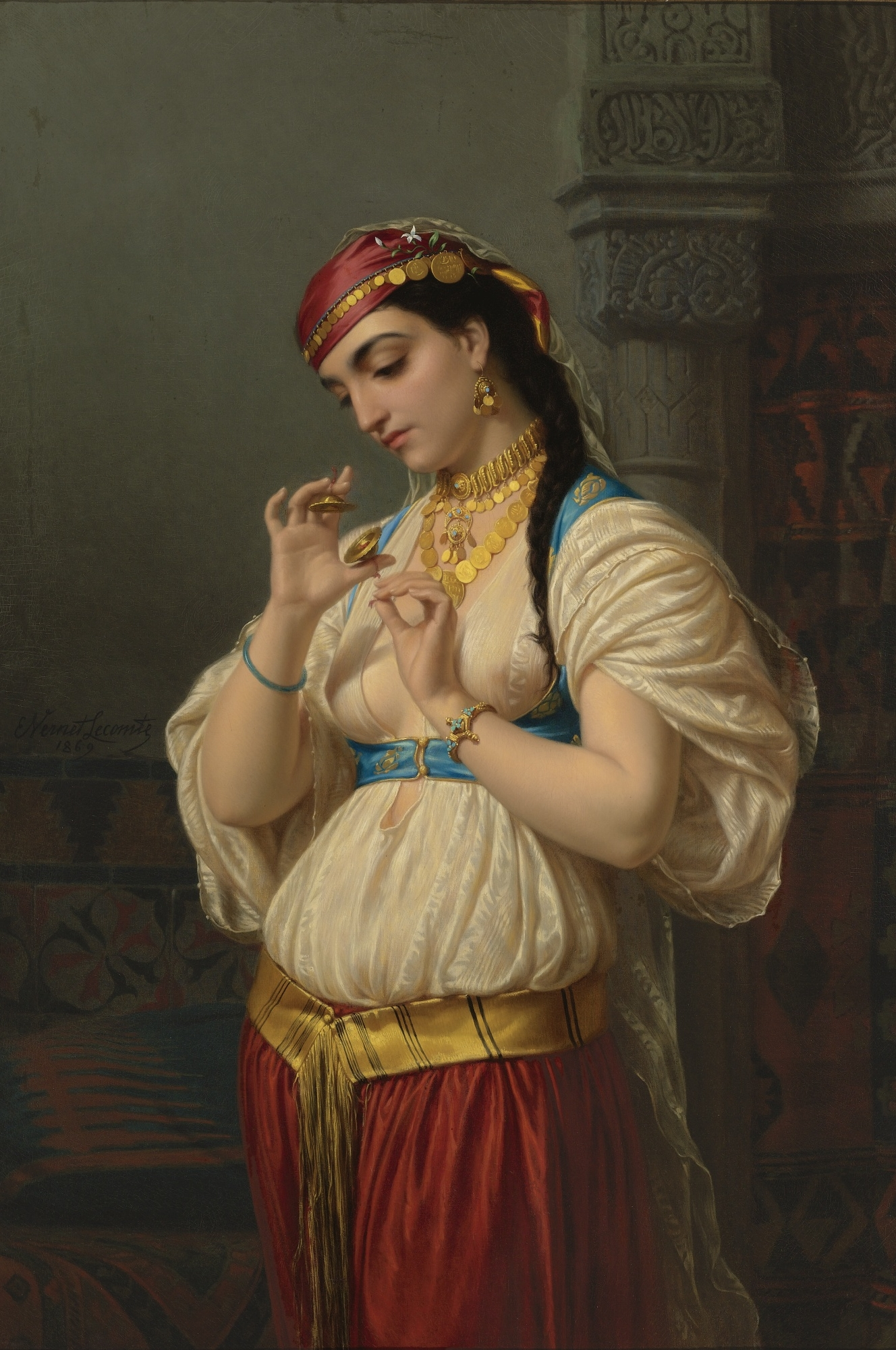
Aimée, a young Egyptian woman, 1869

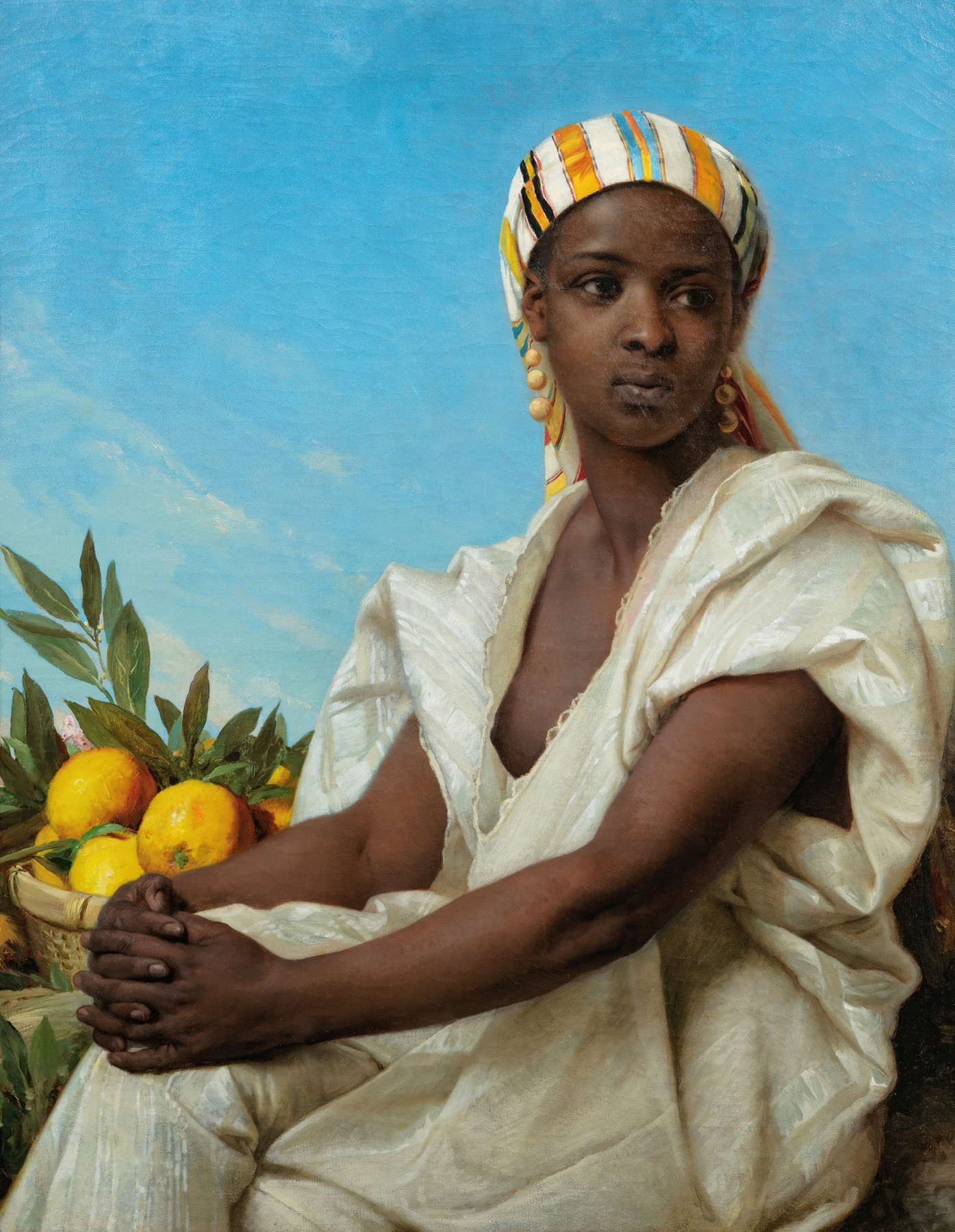
Portrait of a Black woman in loose fitting white robe and wearing an orange striped headwrap

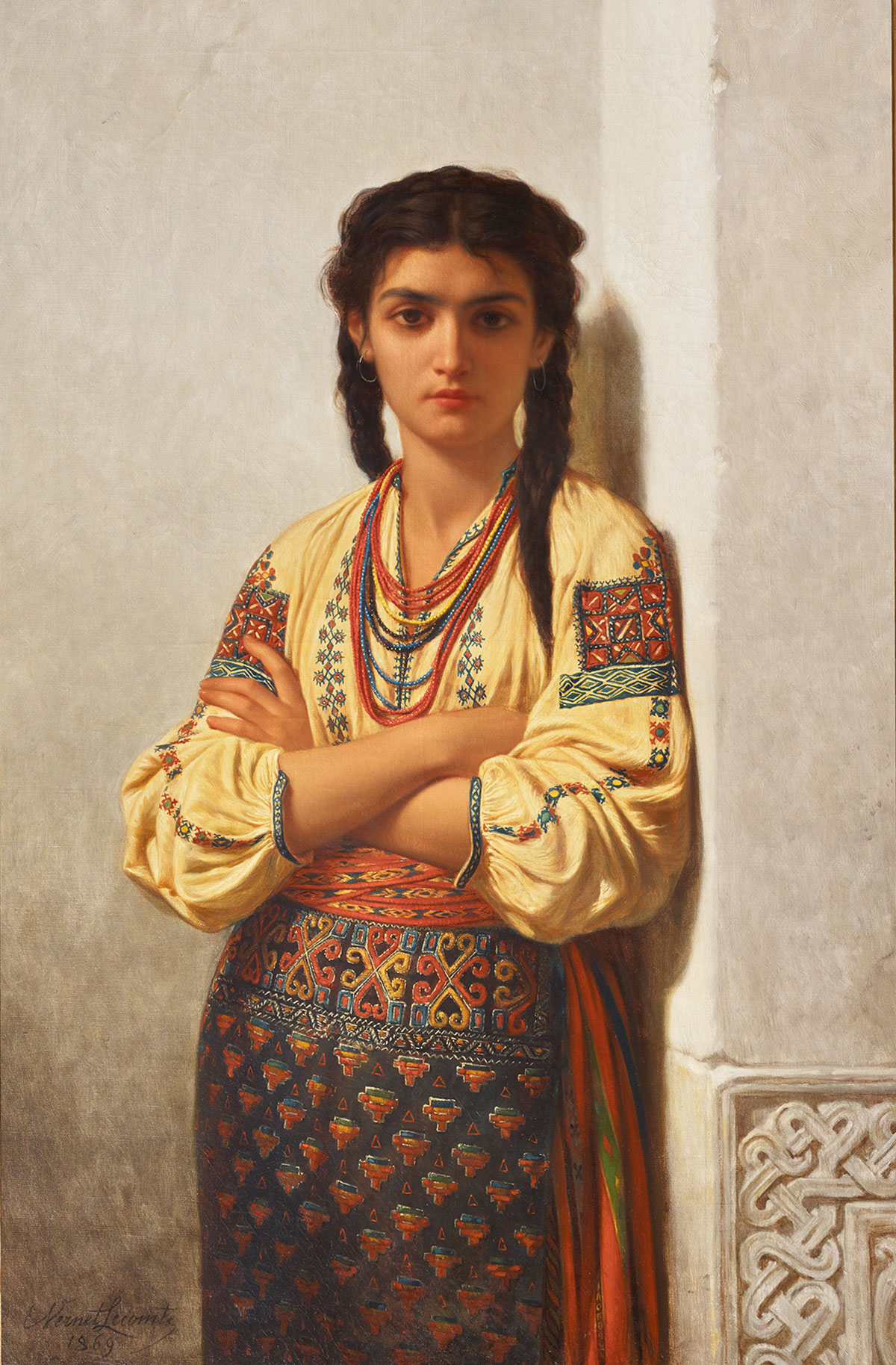
Young Amazigh woman, Algeria, 1869

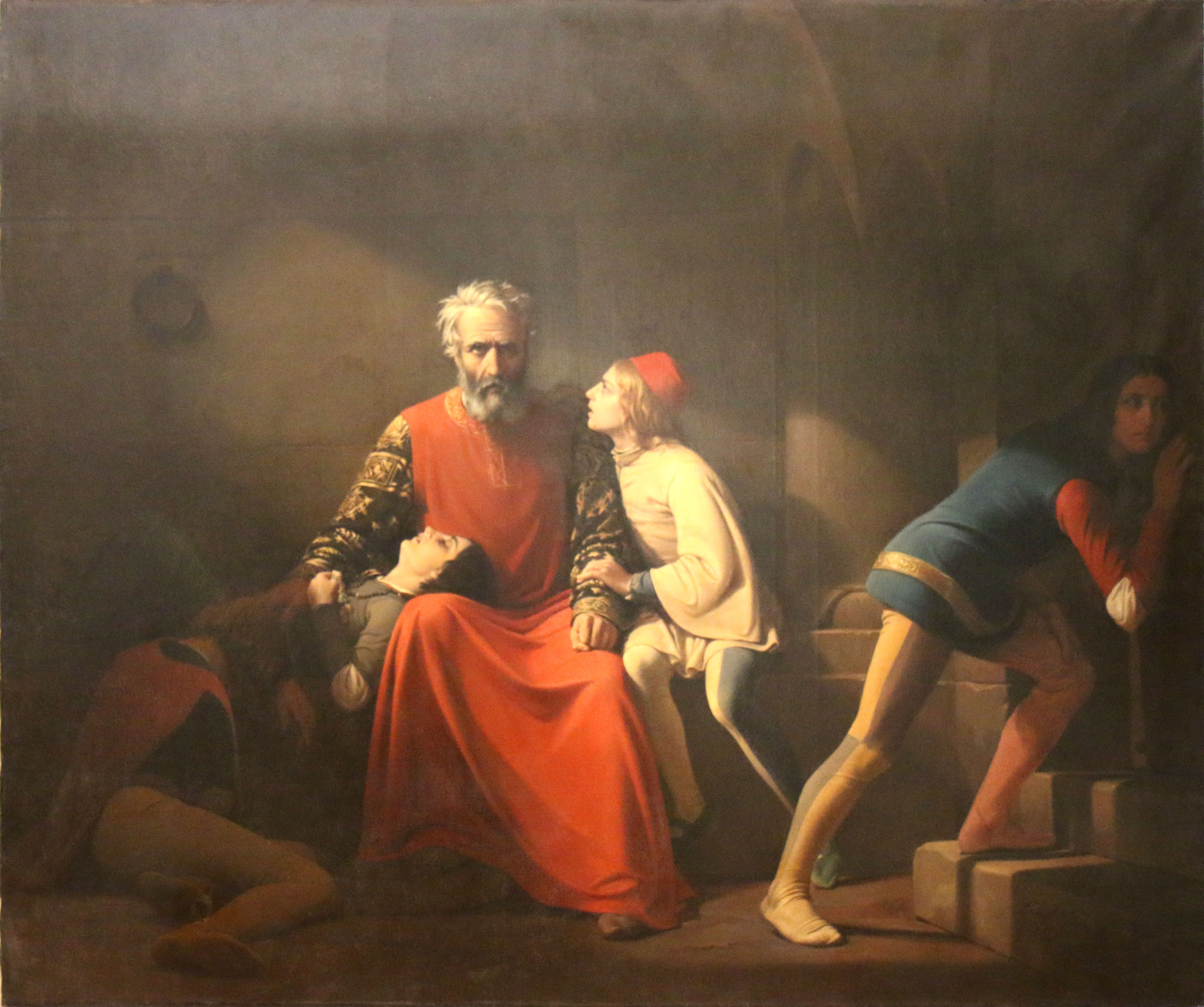
Ugolino and his sons

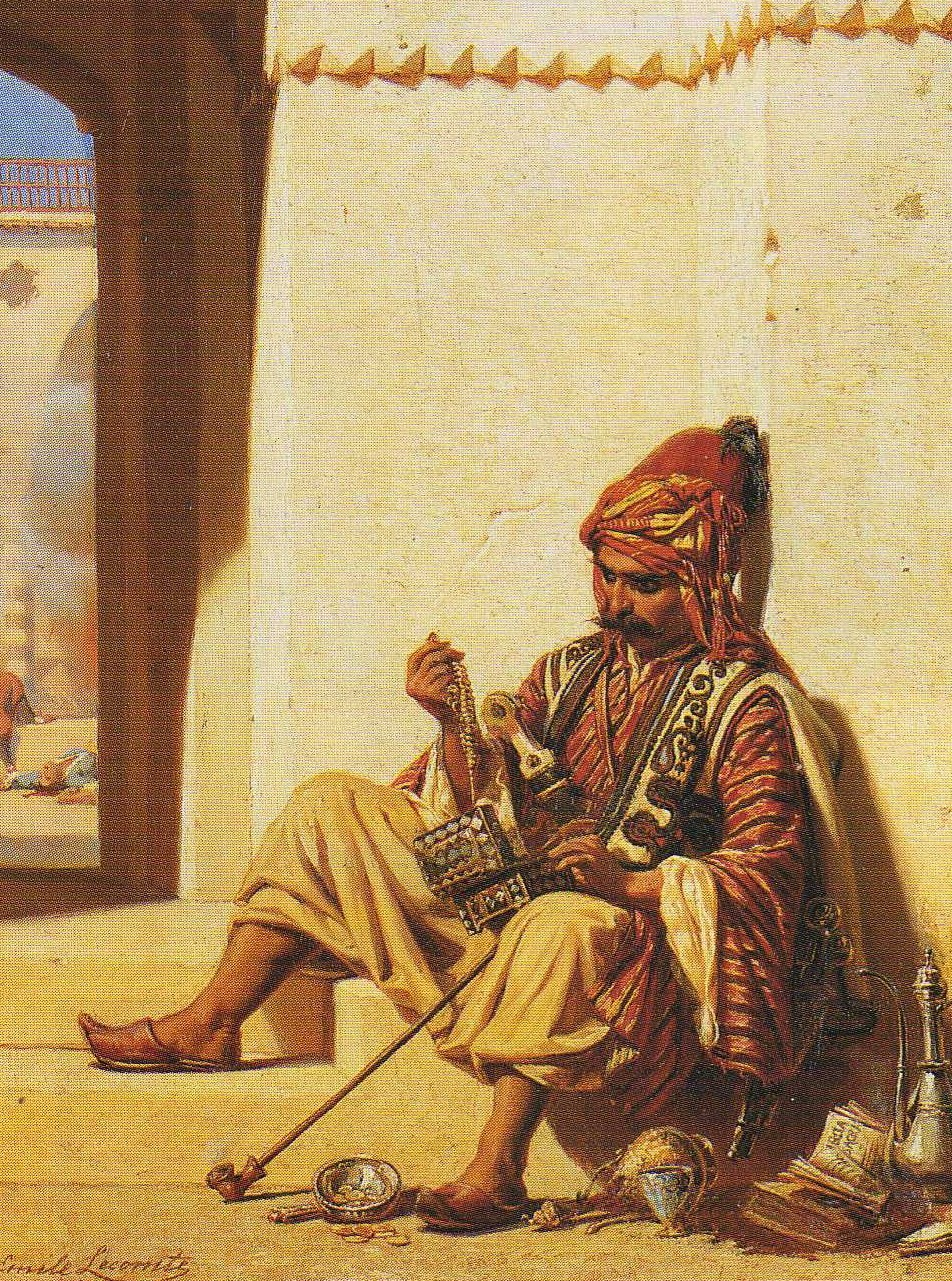
Bachi-Bouzouk looking at his loot, 1862

== Sources ==
- Lynne Thornton, Les Orientalistes Peintres voyageurs, ACR Édition Poche Couleur, Courbevoie, 1994, ISBN 978-2-86770-060-6
