= Galeana =

Galeana may refer to:

== Places ==
=== Mexico ===
- Galeana, Nuevo León, a municipality in the state of Nuevo León
- Galeana, Chihuahua, a municipality in the state of Chihuahua
  - Hermenegildo Galeana, Chihuahua, a town in Galeana municipality, Chihuahua
- Tecpan de Galeana (municipality), a municipality in the state of Guerrero, 100 km westwards along the coast from Acapulco
  - Tecpan de Galeana, the main city of the municipality of Tecpán de Galeana
- Hermenegildo Galeana, Puebla, a municipality in the state of Puebla
- Tuzamapan de Galeana, a municipality in the state of Puebla

== People ==
- Hermenegildo Galeana (1762–1814), hero of the Mexican War of Independence
- Benita Galeana (1903–1995), Mexican writer and activist
- Hortensia Galeana Sánchez (born 1955), Mexican mathematician
- Carlos Alberto Galeana (born 1988), Mexican footballer

== Other uses ==
- Galeana (moth), a genus of moths
- Galeana (plant), a genus of plants in the family Asteraceae
- ARM Hermenegildo Galeana, two ships of the Mexican Navy
