= Hermenegildo Galeana (disambiguation) =

Hermenegildo Galeana (1762–1814) was a hero of the Mexican War of Independence.

Hermenegildo Galeana may also refer to:

- Hermenegildo Galeana, Chihuahua, a town named in his honour
- Hermenegildo Galeana, Puebla, a municipality
- ARM Hermenegildo Galeana, two vessels of the Mexican Navy

== See also ==
- Galeana (disambiguation)
