= Battle of Lomas de Santa María =

1813 battle of the War of Mexican Independence

- Part of the Mexican War of Independence
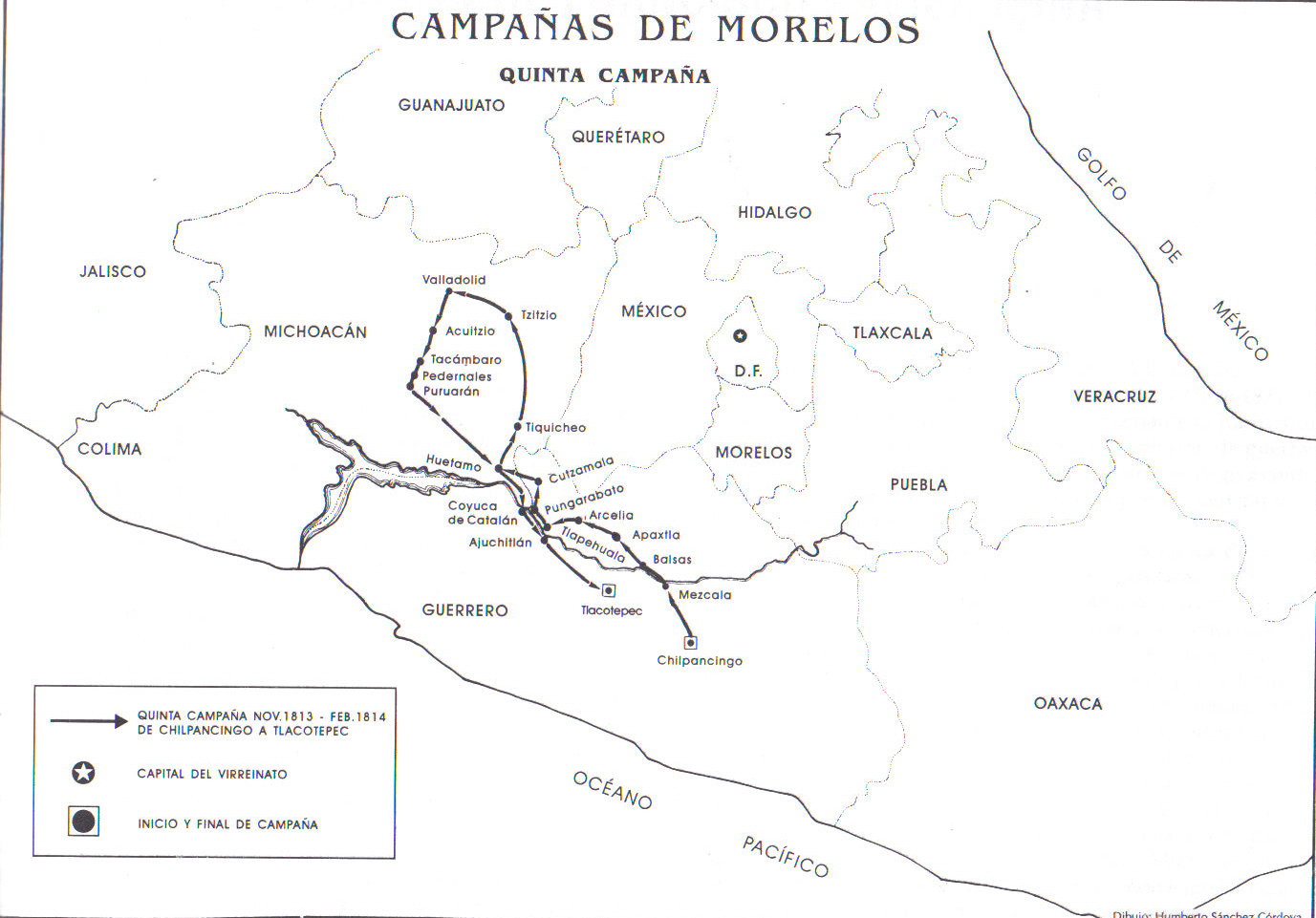
- A map of the fifth and final campaign of José María Morelos, wherein the Battle of Lomas de Santa María took place.
Date	23–24 December 1813
Location	Lomas de Santa María, Valladolid (Morelia) Michoacán de Ocampo, Mexico
Result	Spanish Royalist victory

Belligerents
Mexican Rebels	Spanish Empire

Commanders and leaders
José María Morelos y Pavón; Mariano Matamoros y Guridi; Nicolás Bravo; Hermenegildo Galeana; Ramón López Rayón	Félix María Calleja; Agustín Iturbide; Ciriaco del Llano; Domingo Landázuri

Strength
5,600 soldiers	1,200 soldiers

Casualties and losses
789	200

The Battle of Lomas de Santa María was a battle of the War of Mexican Independence that occurred from 23 to 24 December 1813 in the area around Lomas de Santa María, in the municipality of Valladolid (present day Morelia). The battle was fought between the royalist forces loyal to the Spanish crown and the Mexican rebels fighting for independence from the Spanish Empire.

The battle began when Mexican insurgents numbering around 5,600 men under the command of José María Morelos y Pavón, Mariano Matamoros y Guridi, Nicolás Bravo, and Hermenegildo Galeana attacked the city of Valladolid at midday on 23 December after the Spanish refused their demands to surrender the city.

The Mexican insurgents, who numbered around 5,600 men, were commanded by José María Morelos y Pavón and the Spanish by Agustín Cosme Damián de Iturbide y Arámburu who would later go on to become the Mexican emperor. The battle which lasted the better part of two days, resulted in a victory for the Spanish royalists. The tide of the battle turned when reinforcements arrived from Mexico City sent by the Viceroy of New Spain, Félix María Calleja under the command of Ciriaco del Llano. Around midnight, the royalist forces succeeded in penetrating the insurgent camp, obliging them to flee the battle in disorder. This battle was significant in that it marked the decline of Morelos' military campaign for independence.

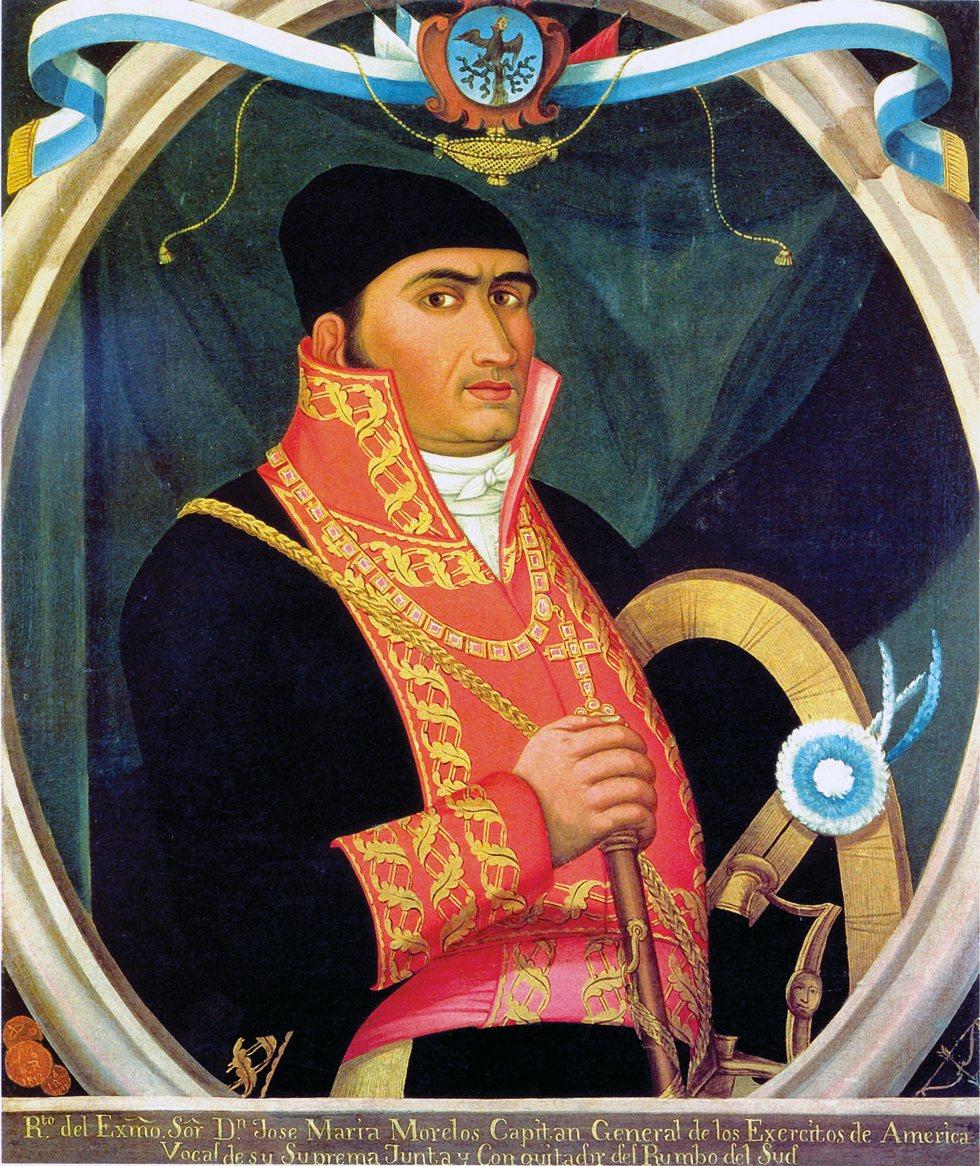
José María Morelos, the insurgent leader.

== Context ==
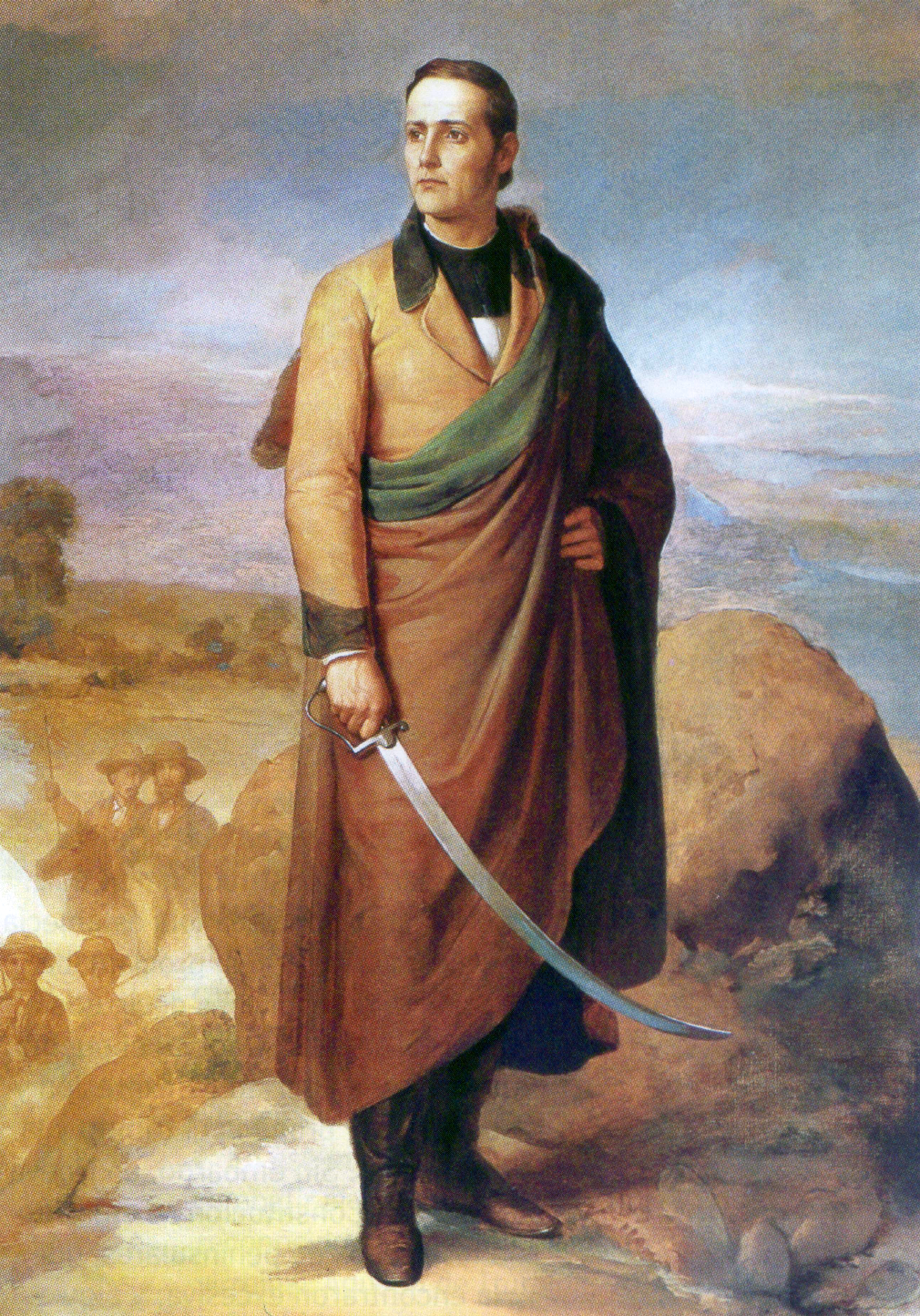
Mariano Matamoros, who commanded the third assault on Valladolid on 23 December.

After the declaration of Mexican independence triggered war with the Spanish royalists, the priest of Carácuaro, José María Morelos y Pavón met with rebel leader Miguel Hidalgo y Costilla on 20 October 1810 at Charo, Michoacán de Ocampo where he was commissioned to fight against the Spanish colonial government in the southern area of the viceroyalty with the established goal of capturing Acapulco de Juárez. After the execution of Hidalgo on 30 July 1811, Morelos became the de facto leader of the insurrection. After the rebel forces failed to capture Acapulco at the Battle of El Veladero, they fortified themselves in Cuautla where they successfully defeated Félix María Calleja at the Siege of Cuautla. From there the rebels marched to Tehuacán, and later to Oaxaca de Juárez to take the city, something they succeeded in doing on 25 November 1812.

In September 1813, the rebels convened the Congress of Chilpancingo, where news reached them of their successful capture of Acapulco. It was there decided that they should attempt to capture the city of Valladolid (present day Morelia) so that the congress could install itself in that city. In November, the rebel army traveled to the provincial capital of Michoacán de Ocampo, arriving in December.

== The battle ==
Félix María Calleja quickly uncovered the rebel plans to take the city of Valladolid through his extensive spy network inside Morelos' camp, also learning where Morelos was moving his forces and which forces were more concentrated than others. On 8 December, by order of the viceroy, Colonel Domingo Landázuri left Mexico City at the head of 1,000 soldiers. The Colonel Agustín de Iturbide joined him at Puebla with the general Ciriaco del Llano, incorporating Landázuri's forces into their own on 23 December at Indaparapeo. Landázuri marched with one third of the troops directly to the city of Valladolid where he began preparations to resist a siege.

Ramón López Rayón informed Morelos of the Spanish royalist troop movements who then ordered Rayón to attack the combined forces of Iturbide and Llano to gain time for his own troops to reach and capture Valladolid. Morelos further understood the need for expediency as he needed to capture the city before the arrival of further reinforcements sent from Mexico City. Rayón and gathered his forces in pursuit of Llano. Various skirmishes took place on 21 December at Jerécuaro where the rebels were repulsed by Iturbide. After the royalists defeated Rayón, they proceeded to chase his army through the campo de Santiaguito where Rafael López Rayón, the only son of the insurgent commander was killed in action.

On the morning of 23 December, Morelos wrote Landázuri asking him to surrender the city of Valladolid, promising to respect the lives of the commander and the royalist defenders. Landázuri ignored Morelos' offer and awaited the arrival of the attack. At midday, an insurgent division under the command of Hermenegildo Galeana began its assault on Valladolid. With just over 1,000 soldiers, Galeana entered the city from the north and routed the battalions placed there by Landázuri who for a time appeared to have been surrounded. About two hours later, the reinforcements under Iturbide and Llano arrived at the city who immediately clashed with the attacking forces under Galeana. Galeana decided to retire from the battle after he assessed his situation as hopeless in taking the city. Ciriaco del Llano had initially wanted to pursue the retreating Galeana, but was ordered not to do so by Iturbide who cited a tactical blunder which would be made in pursuit of the retreating forces. Galeana entered Morelos' camp and asked for reinforcements. Nicolás Bravo decided to attempt to attack the city again with his own division but was stopped by Llano and his troops at the center of the city, repulsing Bravo. Mariano Matamoros commanded the third and final attempt to take the city which failed similarly to the previous two attempts.

After being informed of Matamoros' defeat by the Spanish Royalists, Morelos sent an emissary to Matamoros ordering him to return to camp so that they could again attempt to take the city the following day. The rebels camped in a heavily forested area on the outskirts of the Valladolid plains known as the Lomas de Santa María. Around midnight, the morning of 24 December, Iturbide had discovered the location of the rebel camp and was convinced by Llano to attack with expediency less the rebels be able to attack the city again the following day. Around 2 am, Llano and Iturbide attacked the rebel camp, killing about one fourth of the troops under Morelos' command. Due to the confusion and darkness, the rebel soldiers continued to fire at each other after royalist troops had already withdrawn. They fled the field in panic. This defeat marked the end of the fourth campaign initiated by Morelos and initiated the fifth where this southern noble would eventually meet his downfall and be executed by firing squad in 1815.

== Aftermath ==
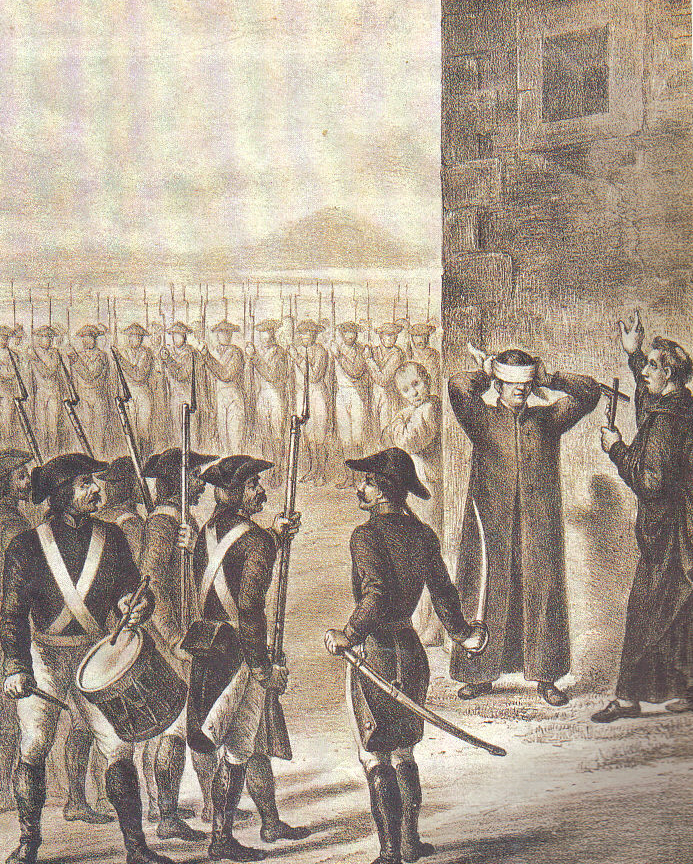
Execution of Matamoros.

Due to concessions granted by members of the Supremo Poder Legislativo, installed by the Congress of Chilpancingo, Morelos decided to retreat with his forces from Valladolid and abandon all attempts to capture the city. He withdrew to Puebla and made plans to continue the fight at Puruarán. On 4 January 1814, Matamoros commanded a force of insurgents at the Battle of Puruarán against an army commanded by Iturbide alone as Llano had been by that time recalled to Spain and named the military commander of Málaga, Andalucía. Matamoros' forces were utterly defeated at Puruarán and Matamoros himself was captured by a loyalist cadet named Leoncio Rodríguez. He was taken prisoner by the Spanish forces and sentences to death on 23 January. Morelos attempted to save his life by offering the exchange of 200 Spanish royalist captured soldiers for Matamoros. The viceroy refused this offer and Matamoros was executed at the Portal del Ecce Homo on 3 February 1814. Upon discovering Matamoros' execution, Morelos ordered the massacre of all 200 Spanish prisoners. Morelos would meet his own death by execution at Spanish hands a year later in 1815.

== See also ==
- Mexican War of Independence
- Mariano Matamoros y Guridi
- Agustín Cosme Damián de Iturbide y Arámburu
- Ciriaco del Llano
- Mariano Matamoros y Guridi
- José María Teclo Morelos y Pavón
