= José Andrade =

José Andrade may refer to:

- José Antonio Andrade, Spanish colonel
- José Leandro Andrade (1901–1957), Uruguayan football midfielder
- José Andrade (footballer, born 1970), Cape Verdean football striker
- José E. Andrade (born 1979), American professor
