= Cuautla, Morelos =

Cuautla Heroic and Historic Cuautla
- Municipal and rural
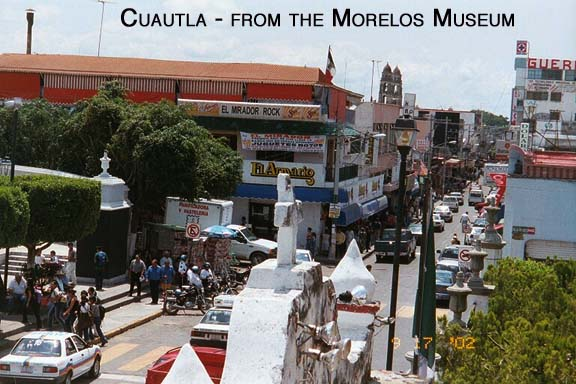
- Cuautla from the Morelos Museum

- Location within Morelos Location within Mexico
- Coordinates: 18°48′44″N 98°57′21″W
- Country: Mexico
- State: Morelos
- Cuautla de las Amilpas: 1585
- Cuautla: April 4, 1969

Government
  - Municipal President: Vacant
  - Federal electoral district: Morelos's 3rd

Area
  - Municipal and rural: 153.651 km^{2} (59.325 sq mi)
  - Metro: 1,037.30 km^{2} (400.50 sq mi)

Population (2020 census)
  - Municipal and rural: 1,673,336 (city); 187,118 (municipality)
  - Metro: 2,638,927
- Time zone: UTC-6 (Central)
- Postal code: 62740–62759
- Area code: 735
- Website: http://www.cuautla.gob.mx

Cuautla (Nahuatl pronunciation: [ˈkʷaʍt͡ɬa], meaning "where the eagles roam"), officially Heroica e Histórica Ciudad de Cuautla de Morelos (Heroic and Historic City of Cuautla of Morelos) or H. H. Cuautla, Morelos, is a city and municipality in the Mexican state of Morelos, about 104 kilometers south of Mexico City. In the 2010 census the city population was 154,358. The municipality covers 153.651 km^{2} (59.325 sq mi). Cuautla is the third most populous city in the state, after Cuernavaca and Jiutepec. The city was founded on April 4, 1829. The 2020 population figures were 187,118 inhabitants for the municipality and 157,336 inhabitants for the city of Cuatula.

The Cuautla Metropolitan Area, the second largest in Morelos, comprises the municipalities of Cuautla, Yautepec, Ayala, Yecapixtla, Atlatlahucan, and Tlayacapan. It covers 1,037.30 km^{2} (400.50 sq mi), which represents 21.26% of the state's total area. The metropolitan population (2010) is 434,187.

== History ==
=== Prehispanic history ===
The Olmec group who lived in Chalcatzingo (southeast of Cuautla) founded settlements in Cuautla, Tepalcingo, Jonacatepec (Las Pilas), Olintepec, Atlihuayan, Huaxtepec, Gualupita de Cuernavaca, Tlayacapan, etc. (Piña Chan y Plancarte).

Five years after the conquest of Cuahunahuác (Cuernavaca) in (1379 CE), Moctezuma Ilhuicamina conquered Huaxtepec (Oaxtepec), Yautepec, Tlayacapan and other towns of Morelos and Guerrero. With Huaxtepec, which was the prehispanic and colonial capital of the peoples of the Plan de Amilpas, its 25-human settlements including Cuauhtlán, had to pay a tribute of 400 cotton blankets, 400 two-color valances, 400 bedspreads, 800 thin cotton blankets, 400 pairs of shorts (patees), 200 women's shirts, and 1,200 veils (mantillas) every 80 days. In addition, they were required to contribute labor.

=== Spanish conquest and colonial period ===
The Plan de Amilpas including Cuautla was conquered by Captain Gonzalo de Sandoval on March 14, 1521. In 1543 New Spain was organized into four provinces: Michoacán, México, Coatzacoalcos, and Las Mixtecas; the present territory of Morelos was part of the Mexico province.

The church and monastery of San Diego were built between 1560 and 1580. The church is relatively small and austere, although there is a beautiful cupola on the south side. The façade of the church is made of pink granite with well-defined bases, columns, and cornices. The small, two-level belltower is square and simple. The monetary is high and formal; it may have been built after the church. The church is unique in that it faces the east, there is no real atrium, and there are neither capillas posas nor an open chapel. Construction of the church of Santo Domingo also began in the middle of the 16th century, but there is little information on it.

After the conquest, Indigenous lands were confiscated, mostly for sugar cane plantations and mills (trapiches). Despite Indigenous protests, Viceroy Gaspar de Zúñiga ruled in favor of the colonists on July 5, 1603. In 1646 the province of México became the Real Audiencia; Cuautla became an alcaldia (mayoralty) belonging to the Intendencia of Puebla.

=== Independence & 19th century ===
After a number of successful battles, General José María Morelos arrived in Cuautla in December 1811. On February 19, 1812, Spanish General Félix María Calleja began the 72-day Siege of Cuautla. Morelos was accompanied by Leonardo Bravo, Mariano Matamoros, Hermenegildo Galeana, Nicolás Bravo, and Manuel de Ordiera. 12-year-old Narciso Mendoza, known as the Niño Artillero (Child Gunner) is remembered for stopping an advance of royalist troops by setting off a cannon. Morelos and his army were able to break out on May 2, 1812.

Cuautla was designated a Heroic City (Heroica Ciudad de Morelos) on April 4, 1829, while Felipe B. Montero was Presidente Municipal (mayor).

An 1865 photograph shows the construction of the second floor of the Palacio Municipal (city hall) in 1865. The building was burned during the Revolution.

The railroad station was opened on June 18, 1881, next to the Convento de San Diego. Tourist trains continue to operate along the line.

=== Revolution & 20th century ===
As a young man, Emiliano Zapata was concerned about land seizures in Anenecuilco, his hometown. In May 1911 he answered Francisco I. Madero's call to arms against President Porfirio Díaz. After minor battles in Chietla, Izúcar, Metepec Atlixco, Yautepec, and Jonacatepec, he arrived at Cuautla on May 11, 1911. With 4,000 or 5,000 troops he surrounded the city, and the week-long Battle of Cuautla (1911) began. The battle was a major turning point in the Mexican Revolution, as Porfirio Díaz said the battle convinced him to sign the Treaty of Ciudad Juárez and resign.

Nearly seven years later, in April 1919, Colonel Jesus Guajardo assassinated Zapata, apparently under orders of President Venustiano Carranza in Hacienda Chinameca, Ayala. His body was placed on a mule and left on the street before he was brought to Cuautla for burial.

The city hall was burned during the Battle of Cuautla in 1911; the bell Nuestra Señora de Dolores was transferred from the Church of Guadalupita on February 19, 2017 when the city hall was restored.

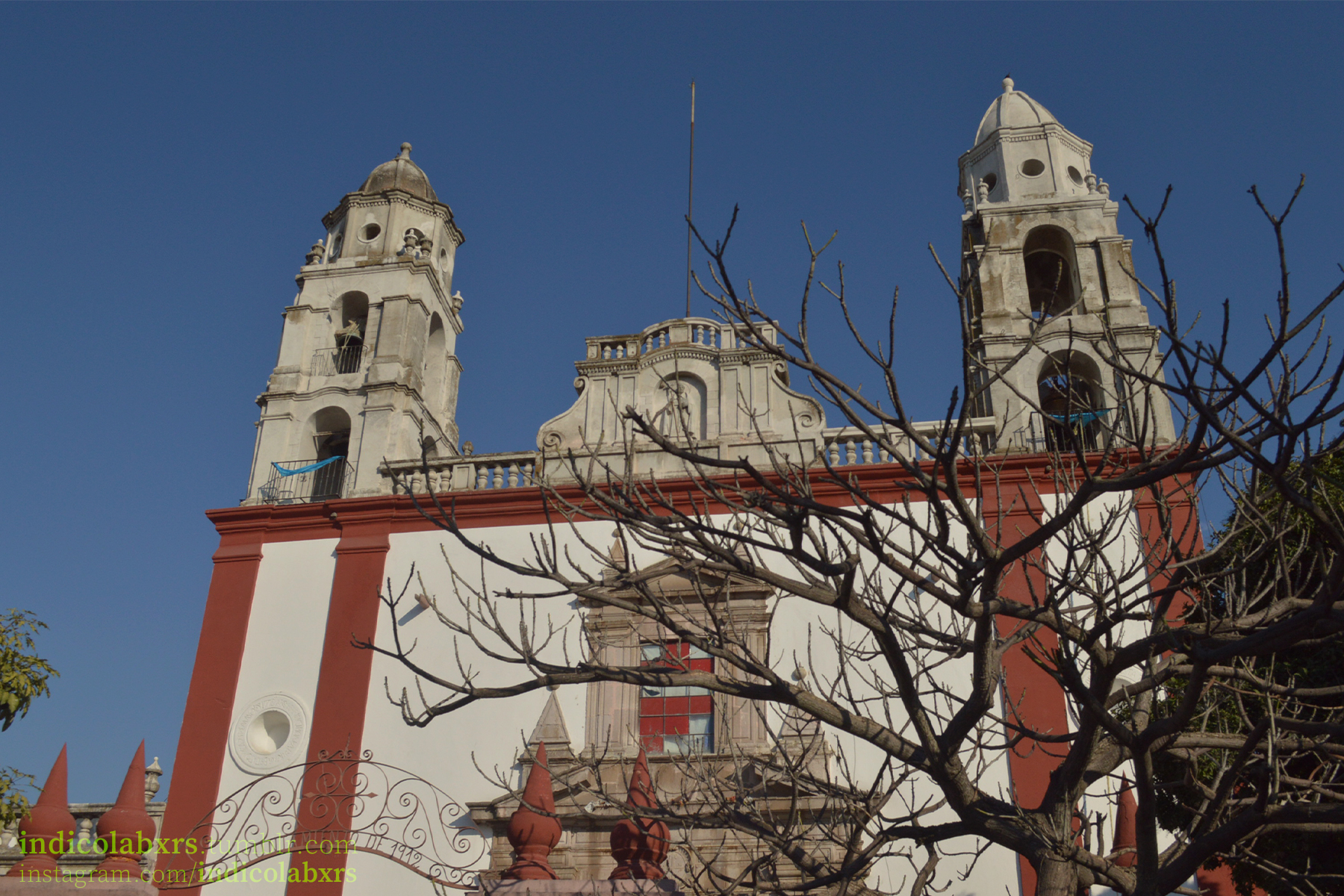
Ex convento dominico y parroquia Santiago Apóstol

=== 21st century ===
Six people, including an 11-year-old child, were killed in the September 17, 2017 Puebla earthquake.

Jesus Corona Damian of the coalition called Juntos Haremos Historia (Together we will make history) was elected Presidente Municipal (mayor) in the election of July 1, 2018.

Tetelcingo was scheduled to become an autonomous municipality on January 1, 2019, but Cuautla authorities objected.

As of May 4, 2020, there were 505 infections and 59 deaths in the state of Morelos and 62 confirmed infections from the COVID-19 pandemic in Cuautla. Schools and many businesses were closed from mid March until June 1. On June 2, Cuautla reported 224 confirmed cases and 34 deaths from the virus; the reopening of the state was pushed back until at least June 13. Cuautla reported an increase of 137 new cases from January 12 to 14, 2021, making 1,602 cases in all, second highest in the state. On March 8 Cuautla became the third municipality in Morelos to vaccinate senior citizens (60+).

Irving Eduardo Solano Vera ("El Profe"), said to be the leader of the Jalisco New Generation Cartel (CJNG), was arrested in Colonia Santa Rosa on February 18, 2021.

=== Notable people ===
Siege of Cuautla

- Leonardo Bravo (1764-1812) was in charge of the 2nd sector (Santiago) of the city. Bravo broke out of the city on March 10, 1812, but was later captured and executed. His brothers Miguel and Victor, and his son, Nicolas also fought.
- Nicolás Bravo (1776–1854), president of Mexico three times between 1839 and 1846.
- Félix María Calleja del Rey y de la Gándara (1753-1828): Royalist general during the siege.
- Hermenegildo Galeana (1762-1814): Galeana was in charge of the 1st sector (San Diego) of the city during the siege.
- Mariano Matamoros y Guridi (1770-1814) was in charge of the 3rd sector (Buenavista).
- Narciso Mendoza (1800-1888): Born in Cuautla, Mendoza belonged to the children's company Compañía de Emulantes (Company of Emulators) organized by Juan Nepomuceno Almonte. Mendoza stopped a royalist offensive by firing a cannon and is known as El Niño Artillero (The Gunner Boy).
- José María Teclo Morelos Pérez y Pavón (1765-1815): Hero of the Siege of Cuautla (February 19 – May 2, 1812); the state is named for him.

Other

- José Agustín (b. 1944) is a Mexican writer who lives in Cuautla.
- Ismael Hernández (b. 1990 in Cuautla) is a Mexican modern pentathlete. He won a bronze medal at the 2016 Summer Olympics.
- Felipe B. Montero, president when Cuautla was granted the title ″Heroic City″ in 1829 and chronicler of the siege
- Jair Pereira Rodríguez (b. 1986 in Cuautla) is a Mexican football defender who plays for Liga MX C.D. Guadalajara.

==== Municipal presidents ====
- Teofanes Jiménez, 1911–1912; Cuautla celebrated the 100th anniversary of the siege.
- Cruz Vázquez, 1913-1913
- Teofanes Jiménez, 1913
- Sixto Ceballos, 1913
- Angel Díaz, 1913
- Sixto Ceballos, 1913-1914
- Everardo Espinosa, 1914-1915
- Julián Sosa, 1915
- Everardo Espinosa, 1915
- Pascual Carrillo, 1915
- Jesús Hernández, 1915
- Nicolás Morales, 1915
- Carlos Escobar, 1915-1916
- Agustín Palacios, 1916
- Agustín Amado Espindola, 1916
- Francisco J. Reygados, 1916
- Francisco Tenorio, 1916
- Salvador Romero, 1917
- Nestor Mendoza, 1917
- Julián Sosa, 1917-1918
- Lanciano Tamayo, 1918
- Felipe León, 1918
- Longino Tamayo, 1918
- Jesús Franco, 1918
- Felipe J. León, 1918–1919; Zapata's corpse publicly displayed
- Pedro Nervaez, 1919-1922
- Joaquín Alanis, 1922
- Antonio Pliego, 1923-1924
- Felipe Amaro, 1924
- Pedro Nervaez, 1924-1925
- Pedro Albear, 1925
- Nemecio Torres, 1925
- Antonio Pliego, 1925-1926
- Manuel Abundez, 1926-1927
- Manuel Contreras, 1927
- Felipe Contreras, 1927-1928
- Antonio Pliego Quintero, 1928
- J. Refugio Bustamante, 1929
- Abelardo Flores, 1930
- Antonio Pliego Quintero, 1931-1932
- Francisco Hernández, 1932
- Manuel Abundez, 1933-1934
- Gil R. Montero, 1934
- J. Isabel Bustamante, 1935-1936
- Nicolás Zapata, 1937
- Antonio Pliego Quintero, 1938
- Alejandro Perdomo, 1939-1940
- Eulalio B. Morales, 1940
- Alejandro Perdomo, 1940
- Benjamin C. López, 1941-1942
- Mauro Belaunzarán Tapia, 1942-1944
- Torcuato B. Gutiérrez C., 1945
- Higinio Peña, 1945-1946
- Fausto González Hernández, 1947–1948; Casa de Morelos museum opens
- Othón Menchaca, 1949-1950
- Antonio Pliego Noyola, 1950
- Manuel Llera Plascencia, 1951–1952; Narciso Mendoza Theater opens
- Amado Torres Guerrero, 1953-1954
- Leobardo Alanís, 1954
- J. Guadalupe Reynoso, 1955–1957; foundation of "Regional Fine Arts Institute"
- Antonio Nava Zavala, 1958-1960
- Fernando Estrada Sánchez, 1961-1963
- Rodolfo Abúndez Fandiño, 1964-1967
- Antonio Pliego Noyola, 1968–1971; "Fine Arts Institute" moved to ex-convent Santo Domingo
- Angel Torres Escalante, 1971–1973; 3 ft (914 mm) narrow-gauge Nacionales de Mexico ends service on October 11, 1973
- Ignacio Guerra Tejeda, 1973-1976
- Raymundo Llera Peña, 1976–1979; historical bell Nuestra Señora de Dolores transferred to city hall
- Rodolfo Abundez Fandiño, 1979
- Alfonso Cerqueda Martínez, 1981-1985
- Luis Miguel Andreu Acosta, 1985
- Martín Garduño Amaga, 1985-1987
- Martín Crisóforo Martínez Nájera, 1987-1988
- José Guadalupe Vique Marín, 1988
- Adolfo Avila Piñarrieta, 1988-1991
- Javier Malpica Marines, 1991–1993; creation of Ecological Protection Zone Los Sabinos, Santa Rosa y San Cristóbal
- Tadeo Espinosa Díaz, 1993-1997 (PRI); environmental education begins in schools
- Francisco Rodríguez Montero, 1997-2000 (PRD)
- Neftalí Tajonar Zalazar, 2000-2003 (PRI)
- Arturo Damian Cruz Mendoza, 2003-2006 (PRD)
- Sergio Rodrigo Valdespin Pérez, 2006-2009 (PAN)
- Luis Felipe Xavier Guemes Ríos, 2009-2012 (PRI); Cuautla receives recognition as ″Historical capital of Morelos″
- Jesús González Otero, 2013-2015 (PRD-PT-MC)
- Raul Tadeo Nava, 2016-2018 (PAN)
- Jesús Corona Damián, 2019–present (Together we will make history)

== Culture ==
=== Celebrations and holidays ===
- January 1: New Year's Day (official holiday)
- January 6: Día de Reyes
- February 5: Día de la Constitución (Monday before the 5th; official holiday)
- February 19: Anniversary of the start of 1812 Siege of Cuautla
- March 8: Día Internacional de la Mujer
- March 21: Anniversary of the birth of Benito Juarez (Monday before the 21st; official holiday)
- Fair of the second Friday of Lent, considered the second in importance of the state (variable date).
- Holy Week (Semana Santa, variable dates)
- April 10: commemoration of the death of Emiliano Zapata (state holiday)
- April 30: Children's Day
- May 1: Labor Day (official holiday)
- May 2: Anniversary of the end of 1812 Siege of Cuautla
- May 5: Cinco de Mayo (national holiday)
- May 10: Mother's Day
- July 25: Feast of Santiago
- August 8: Anniversary of the birth of the General Emiliano Zapata Salazar and feast of St. Dominic de Guzmán
- September 16: Mexican Independence Day Cry of Dolores (official holiday)
- September 30: Anniversary of the birth of the General José María Morelos y Pavón. There is a parade.
- November 2: Day of the Dead
- November 20: Anniversary of the Cry of Revolution (Monday before the 20th; official holiday)
- December 25: Christmas Day (official holiday)

=== Leather, crafts, & textiles ===
- Cuautla is distinguished by its huarachería (leather sandals).
- Tetelcingo is known for the elaboration of wire birdcages, bread boxes, and lace napkins. Women in Tetelcingo wear traditional Indigenous dress, consisting of a navy blue huipil (skirt) and a chincuete that is girded at the waist with a belt loom weaved by them. There are several workshops that are dedicated to saddlery, the manufacture of huaraches, belts, saddles, and all the necessary equipment for riding.

=== Food ===
Rich stews with green or red guacamole, the green mole of pipián with tamales, and cecina. Also huitlacoche, molotes, a squash flower soup (sopa de flor de calabaza), or a mushroom cream soup, or sopa azteca. Also available is pollo morelense, chicken with peanut sauce, flower pancakes, and broken beans (frijoles quebrados).

=== Art ===
Motivos sobre el agua, (Motifs on water) is a fresco painted by Olga Costa and José Chávez Morado, hidden inside the Agua Hedionda Spa. There is a group of plump mermaids playing musical instruments at the bottom of the sea. One carries the zither, another the cello, and one a type of shell or tambourine. They are surrounded by fish, shells, corals, and starfish. It was made in 1952.

=== Dance ===
Las Tetelcingas is a traditional dance dance from the indigenous town of Tetelcingo.

Typical dress: the authentic suit is that of Tetelcinga, which consists of a huipil (tunic) and a tangle of thick dark blue cloth, tied at the waist with wide folds by means of a blue and red sash, a blue skirt, sandals, with a headband made of flowers. The women's hair is worn long, either loose or braided. Eliseo Aragón said that half a century ago some women used to color their hair blue, red, or green, in the Olmec style. It is also said that drinking cups were used on the head as an ornament. The men's costume consists of white cotton pants tied with a red sash, a long-sleeved cotton shirt, a straw sombrero (hat), a bandana, and sandals; however, there are photographs in which the natives of Tetelcingo wear a kind of jorongo (sleeveless poncho) and short leather pants.

== Economy ==
Among the most important activities in Cuautla you will find:

- Agriculture (corn, beans)
- Livestock (beef, pork)
- Nursery (production of ornamental plants and fruit trees)
- Aquaculture (production of aquatic species such as mojarras, prawns, and catfish)
- Agroindustry (sugar cane)
- General Commerce (financial, administrative and real estate services, premises such as stationery, grocery, food, beverages, etc.)
- Services (hotel, restaurant, professional, technical, and personal)
- Tourism (natural areas, lodging, restaurants, bars, nightclubs, water parks, spas, and springs.)
- Construction.
- Manufacturing.

The Cuautla Industrial Park, located in Ayala, covers 130 hectares (320 acres) and is the second largest in Morelos. Most of the companies are related to the automotive industry. The largest employers are Saint-Gobainl, (glass), Sekurit (windshields), and Temic (industrial parts).

Riverside, California is a Sister city.

== Transportation ==
Highways

- Mexican Federal Highway 160 west to Cocoyoc-Yautepec-Jiutepec-Cuernavaca; east to Jantetelco-Izucar de Matamoros
- Mexican Federal Highway 160D (toll) is an eastern spur of Mexican Federal Highway 95D (toll) from La Pera to Cuautla.
- Mexican Federal Highway 115D (toll) north to Oaxtepec-Nepantla-Amecameca; south to Ciudad Ayala-Zacatepec-Atlatlahucan
- Mexican Federal Highway 115 north to Tetelcingo-Tepetlixpa-Atlatlahucan-Mexico City-Ixtapaluca; east to Izucar de Matamoros (co-signed with #160)

Public transportation

Local buses or combis serve Cuautla and nearby municipalities. Taxis and ride sharing are available.

Cuautla has several bus terminals for long-distance travel:

- Estrella Roja (TER) (Cuernavaca, Mexico City, Airport, Puebla)
- Pullman de Morelos (Mexico City, Airport, destinations in most parts state of Morelos)
- Omnibus Cristóbal Colón (OCC) Company based in Cuautla, with service to Taxqueña and Central Norte bus terminals in Mexico City, Oaxaca City, and Veracruz (city).
- Oro (mostly points east: state of Puebla, plus Cuernavaca and eastern Morelos, parts of Oaxaca, Tlaxcala City, and Guerrero)

Trains

There is no regularly scheduled train service. A tourist train, a remnant of the Interoceanic Railway of Mexico, runs occasionally.

Air

Cuautla does not have an airport; flights are available at Cuernavaca Airport, Mexico City International Airport, and Puebla International Airport.

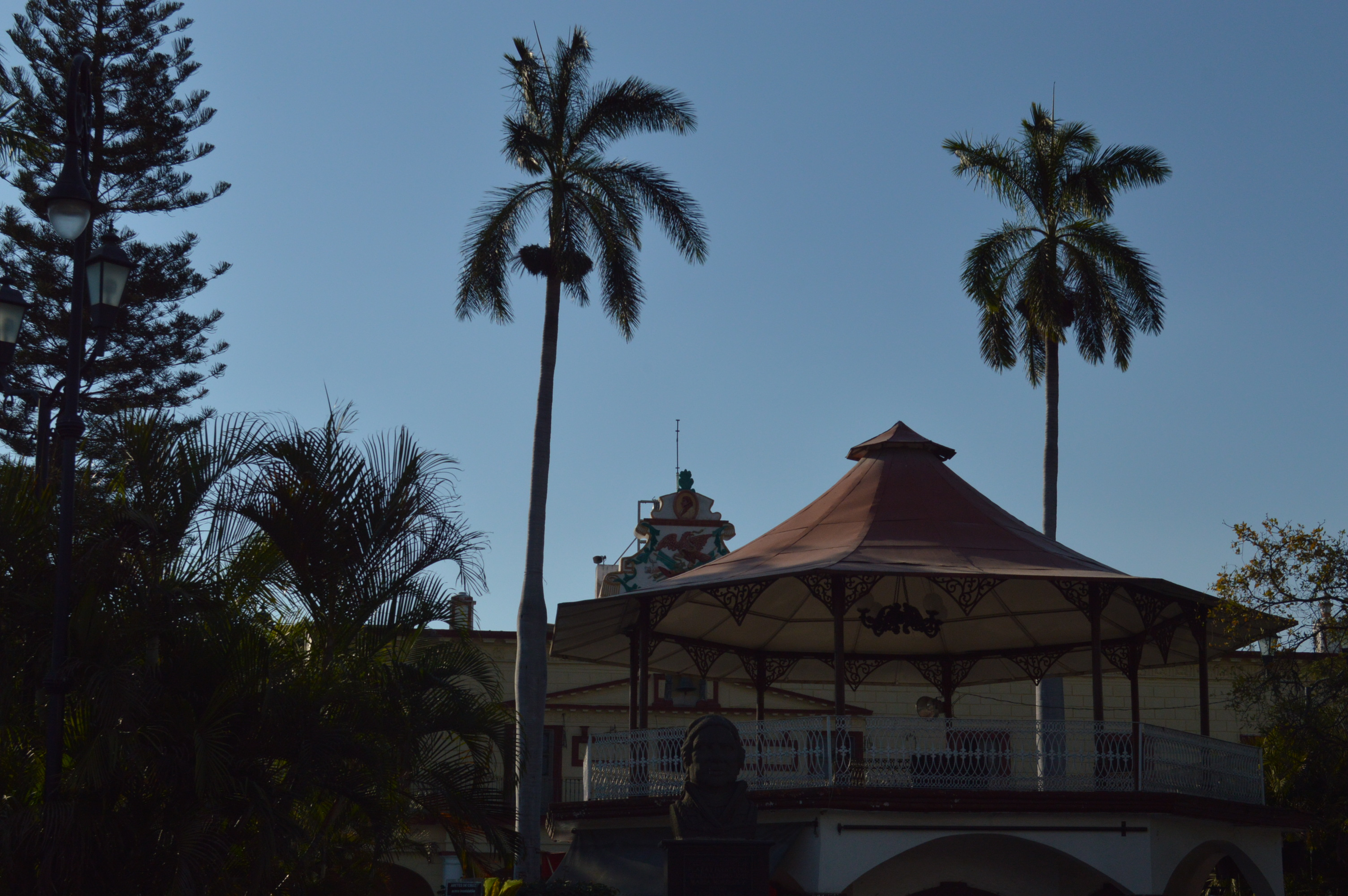
Zócalo de Cuautla: Background Municipality building, kiosk and Jose Maria Morelos bust statue.

== Communities ==
- Cuautla is the municipal seat. It is located at an altitude of 1,294 meters (4,245 ft) and has a population of 157,336. Its Sister Cities are Renton, Washington, and Riverside, California.
- Tetelcingo is a Nahuas community located 6 km (3.7 mi) north of Cuautla. The population is 23,209.
- Tierra Larga has 2,589 inhabitants.
- Ex-Hacienda el Hospital is located at an altitude of 1,277 meters (4,190 ft) and has a population of 2,388.
- Narciso Mendoza is located at an altitude of 1,345 meters (4,413 ft) and has a population of 1,988. Ampliación Narciso Mendoza has 1,180.
- Peña Flores (Palo Verde) is located at an altitude of 1,343 meters (4,406 ft) and has a population of 4,448.
- Puxtla is located at an altitude of 1,266 meters (4,154 ft) and has a population of 1,901.
- 19 de Febrero de 1812 has 1,149 inhabitants, 3 de Mayo has 1,078, and Calderón has 1,050.
- Other communities have fewer than 1,000 inhabitants.

=== Education ===
As of 2014–2015, there are 24 daycare centers with 508 children, 110 preschools with 533 teachers and 7,545 pupils, 101 elementary schools (grades 1–6) with 1,225 teachers and 22,754 pupils, and 42 middle schools (grades 7–9) with 641 teachers and 11,354 pupils

== Attractions ==
The area is a tourist-friendly region with abundant hot springs and health spas/resorts. It features many archeological sites such as Chalcatzingo and Indigenous communities such as the Tepoztlán and Tetelcingo among others.

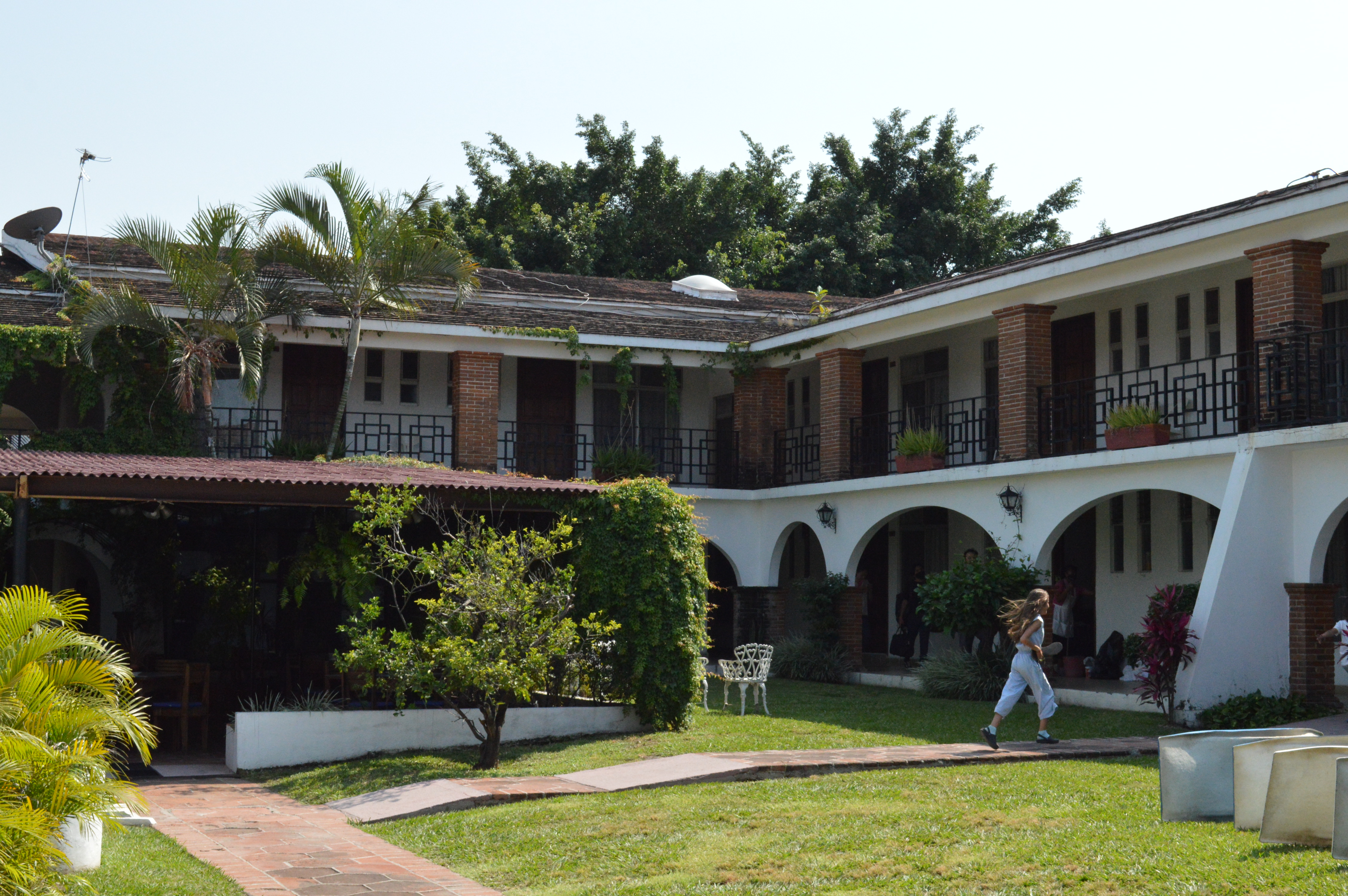
Villasor Hotel/spa facilities.

=== Springs, spas, & water parks ===
- Agua Hedionda (Spanish: Stinky Water), classified as one of the important water springs of the world due to its chemical composition, is located in Cuautla. These waters have a characteristic smell reminiscent of rotten eggs because of their sulfur content. The water is 27 °C (80.6 °F), there is a spring, two swimming pools, and a water slide. The mural Motivos sobre el agua is located in the spa. which was used by Olmecas, Teotihuacanos, Chalcas, Tlahuicas, and Aztecas.Agua Hedionda website
- Balneario Los Limones has a spring, swimming pools, wading pool, playground, water slide, picnic area with grills, camping area, fronton court, and a basketball court.
- Ejidal spa Cups is located in Las Tazas, Cuautlixco.
- El Almeal is a water park in Cuautla. It has a spring, swimming pools, wading pool, athletic fields, and camping area.
- Spa The Plot is a water park in Cuautla at Cuautla-Izucar highway, KM2.
- Quinta Manantial is a water park with a spring in Cuautla.
- Balneario Agua Linda is a public swimming pool.
- Erandi Spa is a health spa in Cuautla.

=== Museums ===
- The Morelos House / Museum contains artifacts and descriptions about Mexican War of Independence from Spain (1812-1821). It honors José María Morelos, whose rebel troops managed to hold off Royalist troops for 72 days, as well as honoring Emiliano Zapata.
- The Morelos Museum adjoins the old narrow-gauge railroad which was used to haul sugar cane to the local mills. The Tren Escénico is a 3 ft (914 mm) narrow gauge tourist railroad offering train rides pulled by an historic steam locomotive once used by the former Interoceanic Railway of Mexico. The narrow-gauge was retired in 1973.
- The tomb of the famous Mexican revolutionary hero Emiliano Zapata is also located in this city, and every year several festivities are held around the anniversary of his death.
- The Teatro Narciso Mendoza is named for the legendary Niño Artillero. This building was inaugurated on January 6, 1952. Today it is a cultural center. There is a 50-meter (164 ft) long mural that tells the history of Cuautla, created by the painter Arturo Estrada, but censored by the religious authority of that time, and covered with white paint.
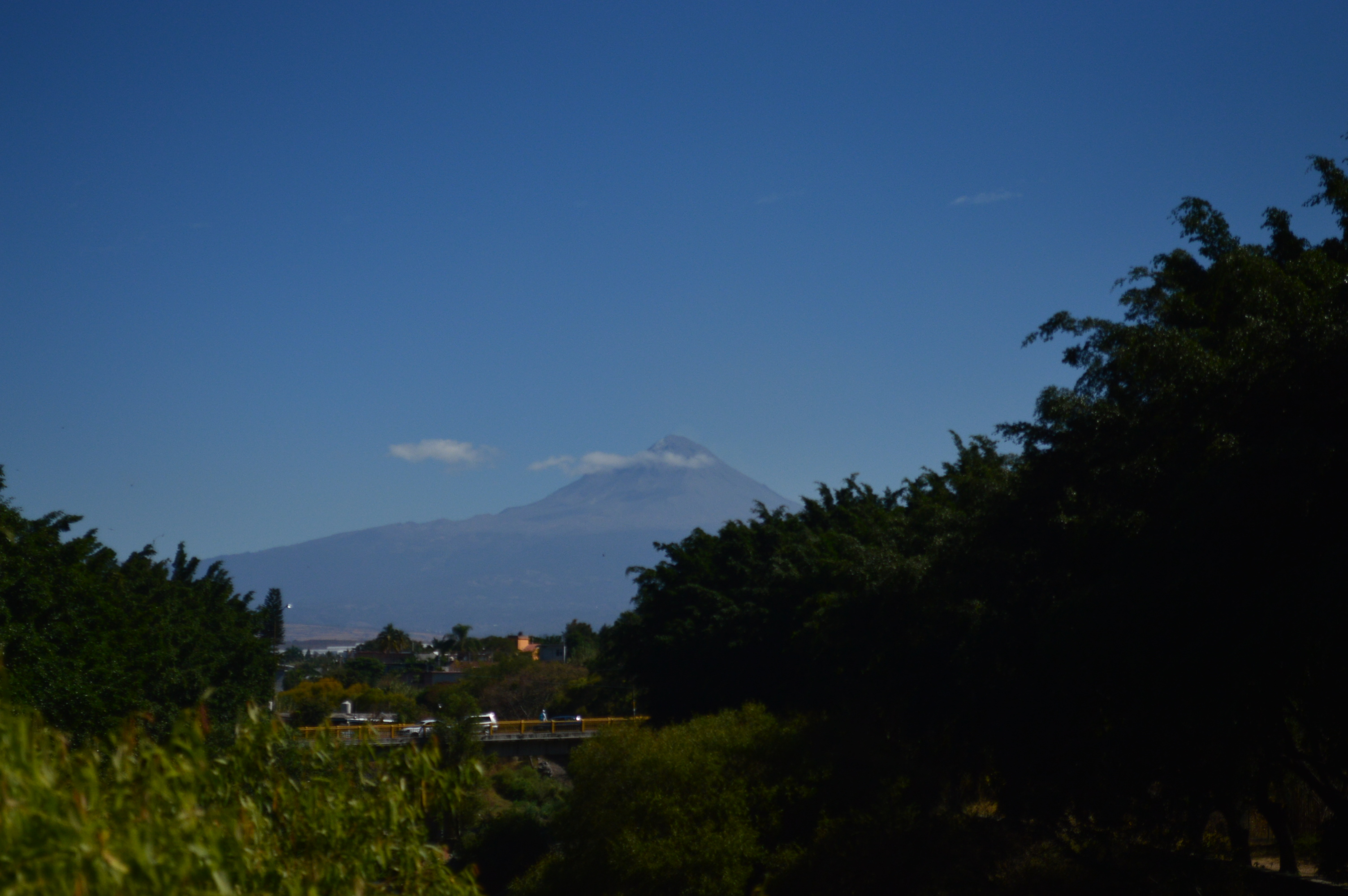
  Popocatépetl. Cuautla's river panoramic view (south-northeast), Cuautla, Morelos

== Architecture ==
The vast majority of buildings in Cuautla are made of brick or cinder blocks, framed by reinforced concrete posts which in turn support reinforced concrete beams, reinforced concrete floors and roofs. Also, many homes in this city, are made with only cinder blocks, cement, and a tin roof. Many of these homes also lack electricity and running water. Nearly all homes have a "tinaco", which is a large plastic water tank on the roof as well as a concrete cisterna below ground. Both are refilled regularly at the same time by the city. When necessary the water is pumped from the cisterna to the Tinaco. These 1,100-liter (290 U.S. gal; 240 imp gal) water tanks let water out into pipes which have valves that are opened as needed to wash clothes and dishes or to bathe or flush the toilet. A single valve is located at the tinacoto be closed if necessary.

== Geography ==
=== Location ===
Cuautla is located in the eastern Morelos, with the geographic coordinates 18°49'N and 99°01'E and an altitude of 1,294 meters (4,245 feet) above sea level. Cuautla borders the municipalities of Atlatlahucan, Ayala, Yautepec, and Yecapixtla.

==== Distance from other parts of Mexico ====
- Cuernavaca - 57.1 km (35.5 mi) via La Pera (45 minuties driving time), 47.9 km (29.8 mi) via Cuauhnahuac (48 minutes driving time)
- Mexico City - 71 km (44 mi)
- Puebla – 109 km (68 mi) (1 hour, 35 minutes driving time)

=== Size ===
Cuautla covers roughly 153.651 km^{2} (59.325 square miles), which is about 3% of the overall size of Morelos.

=== Climate ===
The city is quite warm year-round. In the winter, there is a slight decrease in both the daytime and nighttime temperatures, and because of Cuautla's relative proximity south of the Tropic of Cancer and its altitude (about 4,500 feet or 1,400 meters above sea level), the nighttime temperatures year-round usually average about 57 °F (14 °C). On the other hand, because Cuautla is somewhat close to the Equator, temperatures year-round tend to reach into the mid-80s to lower 90s°F (upper 20s°C to the lower 30s°C) even during the winter, and in spring on many days the daytime temperatures may reach well into the upper 90s°F (lower 30s°C).

Climate data for Cuautla, Morelos (1981–2010, extremes 1927−2016)
Month	Jan	Feb	Mar	Apr	May	Jun	Jul	Aug	Sep	Oct	Nov	Dec	Year
Record high °C (°F)	41.0 (105.8)	44.0 (111.2)	44.0 (111.2)	46.0 (114.8)	45.0 (113.0)	46.0 (114.8)	44.0 (111.2)	44.0 (111.2)	44.0 (111.2)	44.0 (111.2)	43.0 (109.4)	40.2 (104.4)	46.0 (114.8)
Mean daily maximum °C (°F)	27.0 (80.6)	29.2 (84.6)	32.0 (89.6)	33.4 (92.1)	33.2 (91.8)	29.6 (85.3)	27.8 (82.0)	28.1 (82.6)	27.6 (81.7)	28.1 (82.6)	27.7 (81.9)	26.7 (80.1)	29.2 (84.6)
Daily mean °C (°F)	18.7 (65.7)	20.7 (69.3)	22.8 (73.0)	24.7 (76.5)	25.5 (77.9)	23.9 (75.0)	22.4 (72.3)	22.6 (72.7)	22.2 (72.0)	21.8 (71.2)	20.4 (68.7)	18.8 (65.8)	22.0 (71.6)
Mean daily minimum °C (°F)	10.4 (50.7)	12.1 (53.8)	13.7 (56.7)	16.0 (60.8)	17.8 (64.0)	18.3 (64.9)	17.1 (62.8)	17.0 (62.6)	16.7 (62.1)	15.5 (59.9)	13.2 (55.8)	11.0 (51.8)	14.9 (58.8)
Record low °C (°F)	1.0 (33.8)	5.0 (41.0)	5.0 (41.0)	8.0 (46.4)	9.0 (48.2)	10.0 (50.0)	9.0 (48.2)	11.0 (51.8)	8.0 (46.4)	6.2 (43.2)	1.5 (34.7)	5.0 (41.0)	1.0 (33.8)
Average precipitation mm (inches)	10.6 (0.42)	4.7 (0.19)	3.9 (0.15)	12.3 (0.48)	44.2 (1.74)	197.1 (7.76)	168.7 (6.64)	163.0 (6.42)	172.4 (6.79)	65.3 (2.57)	17.1 (0.67)	3.2 (0.13)	862.5 (33.96)
Average rainy days (≥ 0.1 mm)	1.0	0.7	0.7	1.7	5.7	15.5	14.8	15.8	13.9	6.4	1.6	0.5	78.3
Source: Servicio Meteorológico Nacional

== Religion ==
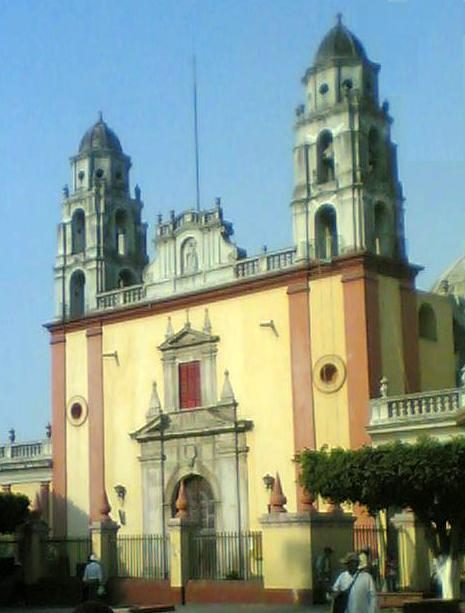
La Iglesia de Santiago Apostol The Church of the Apostle James

The dominant religion in Cuautla is Roman Catholicism. There are 22 registered churches in the municipal area.

== See also ==
- Morelos State site on Cuautla (Spanish)
- Governors of Morelos
- Siege of Cuautla
- Battle of Cuautla (1911)
- List of people from Morelos
