= Battle of Izúcar =

Battle of Izúcar de Matamoros
- Part of the Mexican War of Independence
Date	23 February 1812
Location	Izúcar de Matamoros, Puebla, Mexico
Result	Mexican Victory

Belligerents
Mexican Rebels	Spanish Empire

Commanders and leaders
Mariano Matamoros y Guridi	Ciriaco del Llano

The Battle of Izúcar or the Battle of Izúcar de Matamoros took place during the War of Mexican Independence on 23 February 1812 in the area around Izúcar de Matamoros, Puebla. The battle was fought between the royalist forces loyal to the Spanish crown and the Mexican rebels fighting for independence from the Spanish Empire.

The Mexican insurgents, who were commended by General Mariano Matamoros y Guridi managed to force the Spanish loyalist forces, commanded by the Brigadier General, Ciriaco del Llano to retreat. It was during this battle that a young Vicente Guerrero, later the president of Mexico, first distinguished himself in battle.

== See also ==
- Mexican War of Independence
- Mariano Matamoros y Guridi
