= Agua Hedionda =

Agua Hedionda may refer to:

- The Agua Hedionda Spa, a mineral spring day spa in Cuautla, Mexico
- Agua Hedionda Lagoon, a lagoon in Carlsbad, California
- Rancho Agua Hedionda, located in present-day Carlsbad, California, and encompassing the aforementioned Agua Hedionda Lagoon
