= Capture of Orizaba =

- Part of the Mexican War of Independence
Date	28 October 1812
Location	Orizaba, Veracruz, Mexico
Result	Mexican rebel victory

Belligerents
Mexican Rebels	Spanish Empire

Commanders and leaders
Gen. José María Morelos y Pavón; Gen. Hermenegildo Galeana	Col. José Antonio Andrade

Strength
~10,000 soldiers	600 soldiers

The Capture of Orizaba was a battle of the War of Mexican Independence that occurred on 28 October 1812 at Orizaba, Veracruz. The battle was fought between the royalist forces loyal to the Spanish crown, commanded by General José Antonio Andrade, and the Mexican rebels fighting for independence from the Spanish Empire, commanded by José María Morelos y Pavón. The battle resulted in a victory for the Mexican rebels.

== Context ==
José María Morelos had by this time in the war, made it his goal to conquer the mountainous region of south east Mexico. This was made difficult because such a conquest also involved taking the more heavily defended Spanish cities of Acapulco and Oaxaca. To accomplish his objectives, he moved to cut off communications between Mexico City and the port at Veracruz. To accomplish this, Morelos had to occupy the city of Puebla or Orizaba as both these cities fell between these objectives.

While based in Tehuacán, Morelos reviewed the defenses at Orizaba and decided that its capture would be the most strategically viable of the two. He decided on Orizaba also in part because of the large sums of money and property in the city belonging to the Viceroyalty of New Spain.

Morelos marched from Tehuacán on 25 October with his army which was made up of around 10,000 soldiers. The column reached Orizaba on 28 October 1812. The city was defended by a garrison of around 600 Spanish loyalists commanded by Colonel José Antonio Andrade. In an effort to avoid a battle with such lopsided odds, Morelos sent a representative to discuss terms of surrender with the defending Spanish garrison who promptly refused his offer.

== The battle ==
After the rejection of his offer of surrender, the insurgent forces advanced upon the city until arriving at the city Bartizan where Colonel Andrande had made his defensive stand. The rebel forces were there met with a strong barrage of artillery and musket fire causing relatively high casualties. Morelos retreated from his initial attack and again gathered his forces together while he waited for his soldiers from Santa Catarina and San Cristóbal to get into their strategic positions of attack. Morelos ordered General Hermenegildo Galeana to commence a frontal attack on the city. Morelos took direct command of the Santa Catarina column with which he was able to successfully take the Cerro del Borrego, one of the high ground areas surrounding the city. From this cerro, he commenced an artillery barrage of the city plaza. The loyalist colonel, José Antonio Andrade, caught in the crossfire between Galeana and Morelos, retreated from the city around 11:00 am when Morelos was finally able to enter in the wake of the Spanish.
