= Manuel de Ordiera =

Mexican military officer

D. Manuel de Ordiera was a Mexican caudillo and military officer serving in the armies of the Viceroyalty of New Spain and for the Mexican rebels during the Mexican War of Independence. He is perhaps best known for his command of besieged Mexican forces during the Siege of Cuautla in 1812 at which time he was a captain.

== Role in the Siege of Cuautla ==
The royalist Spanish general, Ciriaco del Llano was marching with about 2,000 soldiers to the aid of Félix María Calleja who was laying siege to Cuautla, Morelos. The leader of the Mexican insurgency, José María Morelos y Pavón, who was consequently trapped in the city, heard the news that Llano was marching on Cuautla. Llano entered the Tierra Caliente on 28 February. Morelos decided to delay the arrival of these reinforcements and sent a sizable force first to be commanded by José Antonio Galeana to occupy the Barranca de Tlayacac with orders to ambush Llano's army. These orders were changed at the last minute and the surprise force was placed under the command of Manuel de Ordiera due to his knowledge of the terrain. The operation became known to Calleja who decided to send a counterattack force under the command of Captain Anastasio Bustamante. Bustamante was able to surprise the rebel ambush force and routed them, allowing for Llano's forces to pass unscathed to Calleja's camp on the morning of 1 March.

== See also ==
- Siege of Cuautla
- Mexican War of Independence
