= José María Larios =

José María Larios (died 1829) was a Mexican insurgent who served as a captain under the orders of José María Morelos y Pavón, working along with him during the Siege of Cuautla. Also, he is recognised for having enacted a plan in 1829 to impose Vicente Guerrero as President of Mexico, after the events of the Riot of La Acordada.

== Military career ==
=== Participation in the Siege of Cuautla ===
José María Larios was in the army of José María Morelos during the Siege of Cuautla in 1812, as related by the Mexican historian José María Luis Mora in his work Méjico y sus revoluciones (1856):

Records show that on January 25, 1814, José María Larios was commissioned by general Morelos in Coyuca de Catalán to conscript people and arms en route to Cuautla of Amilpas (today, Cuautla of Morelos) and the province of Chalco.

=== Fight against the Spanish Invasion of 1829 ===
In November 1828, after the defeat of Vicente Guerrero in the presidential election against Manuel Gómez Pedraza, an uprising known as the Riot of La Accordada unfolded, disavowing the results of the election. In this context, on August 3 1829, José María Larios enacted in the city of Morelos (nowadays, Cuautla) a nine-point plan to combat Spain's latest attempt at reconquest, headed by general Isidro Barradas.

Larios' plan proposed Vicente Guerrero as "dictator for life"; it called for the nationalisation of the goods of the gachupines (pejorative form to designate the Spaniards) and foreigners; and it appointed the group headed by Larios himself as "Primera Columna Justiciera del Sur" in order to fight the invaders in Veracruz. According to the records, during this stage Larios was associated with attacks on haciendas and thefts "in the name of the patriots and of general Guerrero".
