= Siege of Huajuapan de León =

- Part of the Mexican War of Independence
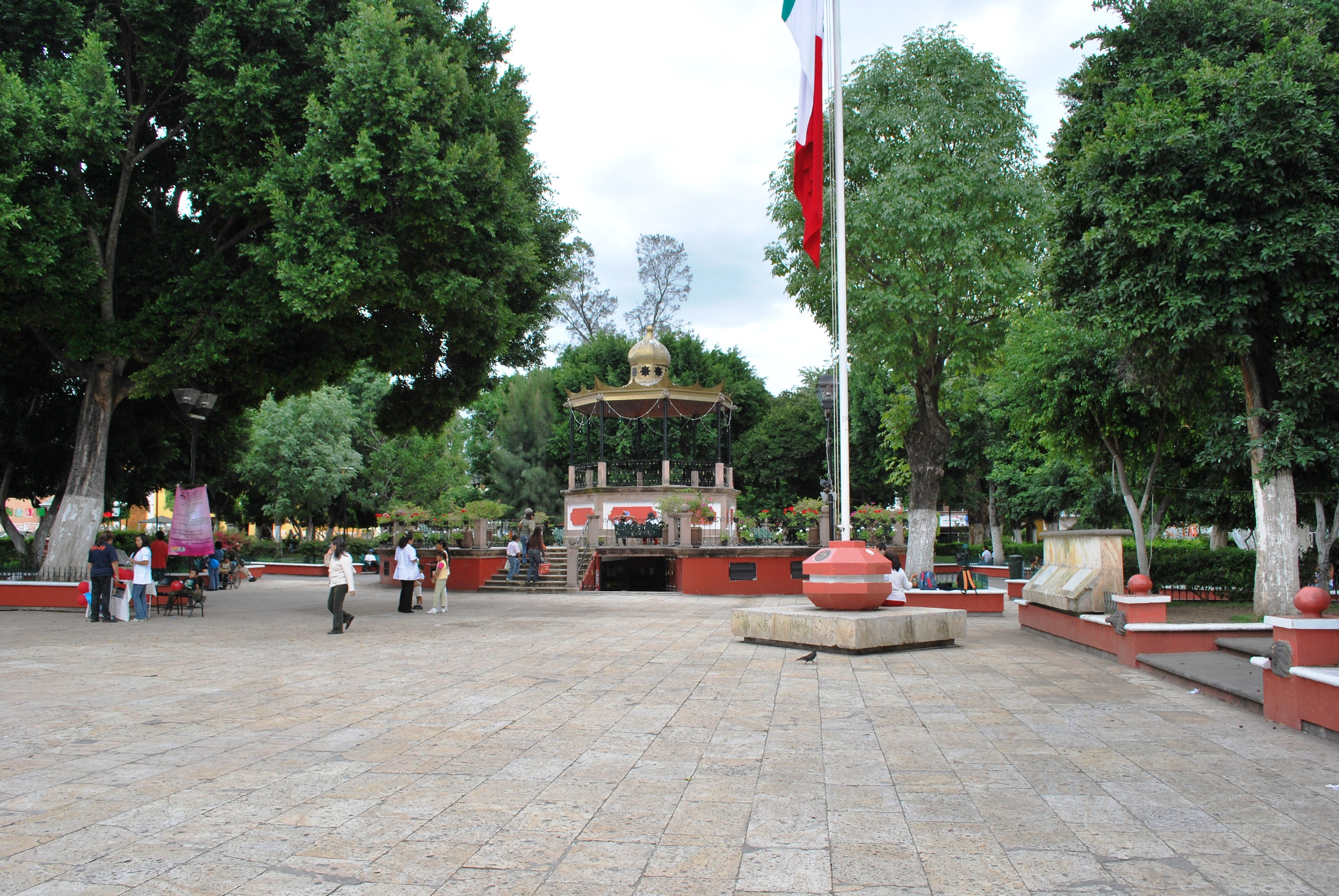
- The main square in Huajuapan's Independence Park.
Date	5 April – 23 July 1812
Location	Huajuapan de León, Oaxaca, Mexico
Result	Mexican rebel victory

Belligerents
Mexican Rebels	Spanish Empire

Commanders and leaders
José María Morelos; Valerio Trujano; Miguel Bravo	José María de Régules Villasante; Bemardino Bonavia

Strength
Thousands	1,500

Casualties and losses
Unknown	400 dead

The siege of Huajuapan de León was a battle of the Mexican War of Independence that was fought from 5 April to 23 July 1812 at Huajuapan de León, in the Mexican state of Oaxaca. The battle was fought between the royalist forces loyal to the Spanish crown, and the Mexican rebels fighting for independence from the Spanish Empire. This Spanish siege of the town, lasting 111 days, was the longest of the entire war. The battle resulted in a victory for the Mexican insurgents.

The siege was defended against by a group of local insurgents commanded by Colonel Valerio Trujano. This siege is considered one of the most important battles of the second phase of the Mexican War for Independence.

== Context ==
The insurgent forces commanded by Valerio Trujano and Miguel Bravo had joined together with those of the priest, Father Mendoza at the beginning of March 1812 at Tamazulapan, Oaxaca. Their goal was to defeat the royalist General José María de Régules Villasante who had fortified himself at Yanhuitlán

At the beginning of the insurgent attacks, Régules Villasante decided to occupy only the town square and the buildings in its immediate vicinity. The insurgent attackers, who initially believed their assault to be a complete success, were turned back and obliged to retreat once they reached the fierce Spanish resistance in the city center. Miguel Bravo marched from there with his forces to Cuautla to aid Generalissimo José María Morelos y Pavón who was there besieged by royalist forces. Trujano, for his part, marched with his own troops to Huajuapan where he fortified the city and recovered from the defeat at Yanhuitlán.

== The siege ==
A royalist commander named Bemardino Bonavia who controlled one royalist division, began the siege against the town in an effort to regain Spanish control. He was quickly aided by more royalist troops under the command of José María de Régules Villasante on 5 April 1812 beginning the siege. The Spanish forces numbered about 1,500 men with 14 pieces of artillery. Five days after their arrival at Huajuapan, the royalist troops opened fire on the city, unleashing all their firepower on the rebel defenses. Valerio Trujano, who had no artillery of his own with which to defend the city, was unable to return fire until the fabrication of new artillery pieces made from the town's church bells.

Royalist attacks on the town were almost constant, however, they were continually repulsed by the insurgent defenders. On 17 May, a messenger, José Remigio Sarabia, an Indian from the town of Santiago Nuyoo, managed to get through the blockaded city and get word to General José María Morelos, who was in Chilapa at the time. He informed the General that the Spanish were besieging the city. Morelos decided to come to Trujano's aid and ordered Miguel Bravo's forces to march to Huajuapan de León to lift the siege where Morelos himself would follow a short time later. On 23 July, the rebel forces managed to break the siege around four o clock in the afternoon.

The Mexican relief army consisted of a few thousand men and included such people as Vicente Guerrero, the Galeana brothers and the Bravo brothers. The division under the control of Morelos was split into four columns that formed four fronts of attack. These attacks were successful in breaking the Spanish siege positions. The Spanish royalists decided to withdraw from the battle, leaving behind 30 cannons, over 1,000 muskets, horses, various supplies and over 400 dead.

== Celebration at Huajuapan ==
Upon liberating the city, Morelos, being an extremely devoted Catholic, ordered a public holiday in the Catholic tradition to honor the Señor de los Corazones to acknowledge his help in the resistance to the siege. The novena concluded exactly on 23 July and coincided with the breaking of the siege. Since then, Huajuapan observes a public holiday on this day to commemorate its date.

From 14 July through 24 July, the novena is celebrated with daily masses and processions through the different parishes of the city to the cathedral, where the image of the Señor de los Corazones can be found. Much of these festivities are organized by the brotherhood of the Señor de los Corazones. At the conclusion of the religious observances, various cultural, artistic and recreational activities take place throughout the town as well as a fireworks show. On the night of 23 July, the bishop of the town together with the bulk of the clergy from the diocese, celebrates a mass in the atrium of the central cathedral to give thanks for the heroic defense of the city. On 24 July, the streets of the city are decorated with different chalk drawings as supplementary decoration for the largest procession which occurs in conjunction with religious songs, mariachi music and flowers and follows the main streets of the city.

== See also ==
- Mexican War of Independence
