= José Gabriel de Armijo =

Spanish and Mexican general

- Born: 1774; San Nicolás de Tierra Nueva, Viceroyalty of New Spain (now Tierra Nueva, San Luis Potosí, Mexico)
- Died: August 30, 1830 (aged 55–56); Texca, Guerrero
- Military career
- Allegiance: New Spain; Mexico
- Branch: Spanish Army; Mexican Army
- Service years: 1795–1821 (Spain); 1821–1830 (Mexico)
- Rank: Commander (Spain & Mexico)
- Conflicts: Mexican War of Independence: Siege of Cuautla; Battle of Calderón Bridge; Battle of Aculco; Battle of the Cerro de Barrabás; Casa Mata Plan Revolution: Battle of Almolonga; Vicente Guerrero led-rebellion: Battle of Texca

José Gabriel de Armijo (1774–1830) was a Spanish and Mexican military commander of caudillo origin known for his role in the Mexican War of Independence.

== Biography ==
José Gabriel was born in San Nicolás de Tierranueva, San Luis Potosí in 1774. On 16 October 1795, he enters the historical chronicle when he joined the militia of the State of San Luis Potosí as a dragoon sergeant.

He later was a part of the military corps under the command of General Félix María Calleja del Rey, who would later become Viceroy of New Spain, at the outbreak of the Mexican War of Independence. Under Calleja's command, Armijo participated in the Battle of Aculco, the Battle of Guanajuato and the Battle of the Puente de Calderón.

He went on to gain his own command within the Spanish royalist army until the formal independence of Mexico. In 1812, he again served in Calleja's army commanding forces at the Siege of Cuautla.

On 30 September 1818, the fought against the Mexican rebels under the command of future Mexican president Vicente Guerrero at the Battle of the Cerro de Barrabás, a Spanish defeat.

In 1821, he signed on to the Plan of Iguala and joined the Army of the Three Guarantees. During the First Mexican Empire, he fought in the Battle of Almolonga on the side of Agustín de Iturbide and the imperialists against the republican rebels. In this battle, he defeated the rebel army under the command of his old adversaries, Vicente Guerrero and Nicolás Bravo.

On 11 March 1830, when Juan José Codallos Núñez proclaimed the Plan of the Fortaleza de Santiago, he was ordered to do battle against Col. Juan Álvarez. On 30 August of the same year, he was defeated at the Battle of Texca by the federalist forces under Álvarez. Whilst fleeing the field of battle, he was caught by Álvarez' pursuing troops in a gully and was hacked to death shortly thereafter.

== In popular culture ==
José Gabriel de Armijo has been portrayed in various movies and books as he is a character that is significant in Mexican history. In 1943, he was played by Antonio Bravo in the film El rayo del sur. In 2010, he was played by Felipe Nájera in the Mexican TV show "Gritos de muerte y libertad". He appears in the episode titled La última conjura.

== Bibliography ==
- González Pedrero, Enrique (2004). País de un solo hombre: el México de Santa Anna. Volumen II. La sociedad de fuego cruzado 1829-1836 (in Spanish). México: Fondo de Cultura Económica. ISBN 968-16-6377-2.
- Enrique de Olavarría y Ferrari (1880). "México independiente 1821-1855". México a través de los siglos (in Spanish). Vicente Riva Palacio, editor. México: Ballescá y Cía.
