= Siege of Cuautla =

1812 battle of the Mexican War of Independence

Coordinates: 18.811810°N 98.955090°W

- Part of the Mexican War of Independence
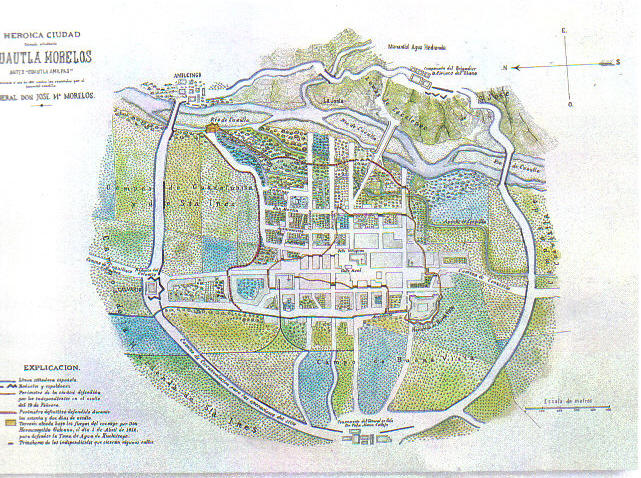
- Map of Cuautla Amilpas (today known as Cuautla Morelos) drawn in 1812.
Date	19 February – 2 May 1812
Location	Cuautla, Morelos, Mexico
Result	Disputed, Mexican rebels abandon the city after 72 days of Spanish siege.

Belligerents
Mexican Rebels	(Spain) Spanish Empire

Commanders and leaders
Gen. José María Morelos y Pavón Mariano Matamoros; Hermenegildo Galeana; Leonardo Bravo; Víctor Bravo; Nicolás Bravo; José Antonio Galeana; Manuel de Ordiera	(Spain) Viceroy Francisco Xavier Venegas (Spain) Félix María Calleja (Spain) Ciriaco del Llano (Spain) José Gabriel de Armijo (Spain) José Antonio Andrade (Spain) Captain Anastasio Bustamante

Strength
~17,000 soldiers	~12,000 soldiers

Casualties and losses
6,000	3,000

The siege of Cuautla was a battle of the War of Mexican Independence that occurred from 19 February through 2 May 1812 at Cuautla, Morelos. The Spanish royalist forces loyal to the Spanish, commanded by Félix María Calleja, besieged the town of Cuautla and its Mexican rebel defenders fighting for independence from the Spanish Empire. The rebels were commanded by José María Morelos y Pavón, Hermenegildo Galeana, and Mariano Matamoros. The battle results are disputed, but it is generally agreed that the battle resulted more favorably for the Spanish whose siege was ultimately successful with the Mexican withdrawal on 2 May 1812.

The siege had many consequences to the political, military and social environment in the contemporary Viceroyalty of New Spain which was ruled since 1810 by Francisco Xavier Venegas. Calleja was turned from military commander of all central Mexico to the military commander of Mexico City after fears began of an insurgent attack on the capital. Morelos would continue gaining strength, reinforcing his army and taking new cities throughout the south of the country such as Oaxaca and Córdoba. A further consequence came with the rise to the throne of Ferdinand VII of Spain, when Venegas was relieved of his command as viceroy in February 1813.

== Context ==
On 16 September 1810, Miguel Hidalgo y Costilla rose in rebellion, rallying the town of Dolores to fight for independence from the Spanish crown. This series of events triggered the Mexican War of Independence and various cities began to fall to the rebel cause. On 28 September of the same year, the rebel forces took over Guanajuato, on 17 October and 25 respectively, the rebels captured Valladolid and Toluca. On 30 October, they routed a loyalist army at the Battle of Monte de las Cruces, and two days later they were at the gates of Mexico City where they were eventually pushed back to the area around Bajío. Loyalist soldiers under the command of Félix María Calleja defeated Hidalgo's army for the first time at the Battle of Aculco, splitting the insurgents into different groups. Hidalgo's army marched towards Valladolid where various atrocities were committed against the local Spanish population. On 19 November, Hidalgo arrived at Guadalajara, which had been re-taken the same day as the Battle of Aculco by Spanish forces under José Antonio Torres, where he again took control of the city and massacred the Spanish inhabitants. On 26 November, Calleja took Guanajuato back from the rebels, forcing the rebel forces under Ignacio José de Allende y Unzaga and Juan Aldama to retire to Guadalajuara where they again conducted purges of the Spanish population. By 17 January 1811, Calleja had once again defeated rebel forces at the Battle of the Puente de Calderón, after which rebel forces fled to Coahuila. On 21 March, Ignacio Elizondo, captured many of these fleeing rebels at Las Norias de Acatita de Baján. After being tried, Allende, Aldama and José Mariano Jiménez, alongside other noteworthy rebel leaders were executed on 26 June at Chihuahua. For his part, Hidalgo himself was caught and executed on 30 July.

Prior to his capture and subsequent execution, Hidalgo had confirmed José María Morelos as the commander of all rebel forces in the south of Mexico. By November 1810, Morelos had conquered most of the territory of the Guerrero. It was there that he issued the Bando del Aguacatillo, the first edict in the history of Mexico dictating individual rights. In February 1811, Morelos failed to take the city of Acapulco. He then began a campaign throughout the center of the country, taking Izúcar in December whilst Hermenegildo Galeana took Taxco. Marching through the mountains surrounding Puebla, Morelos reached Cuautla In January 1812.

== Maneuvers ==
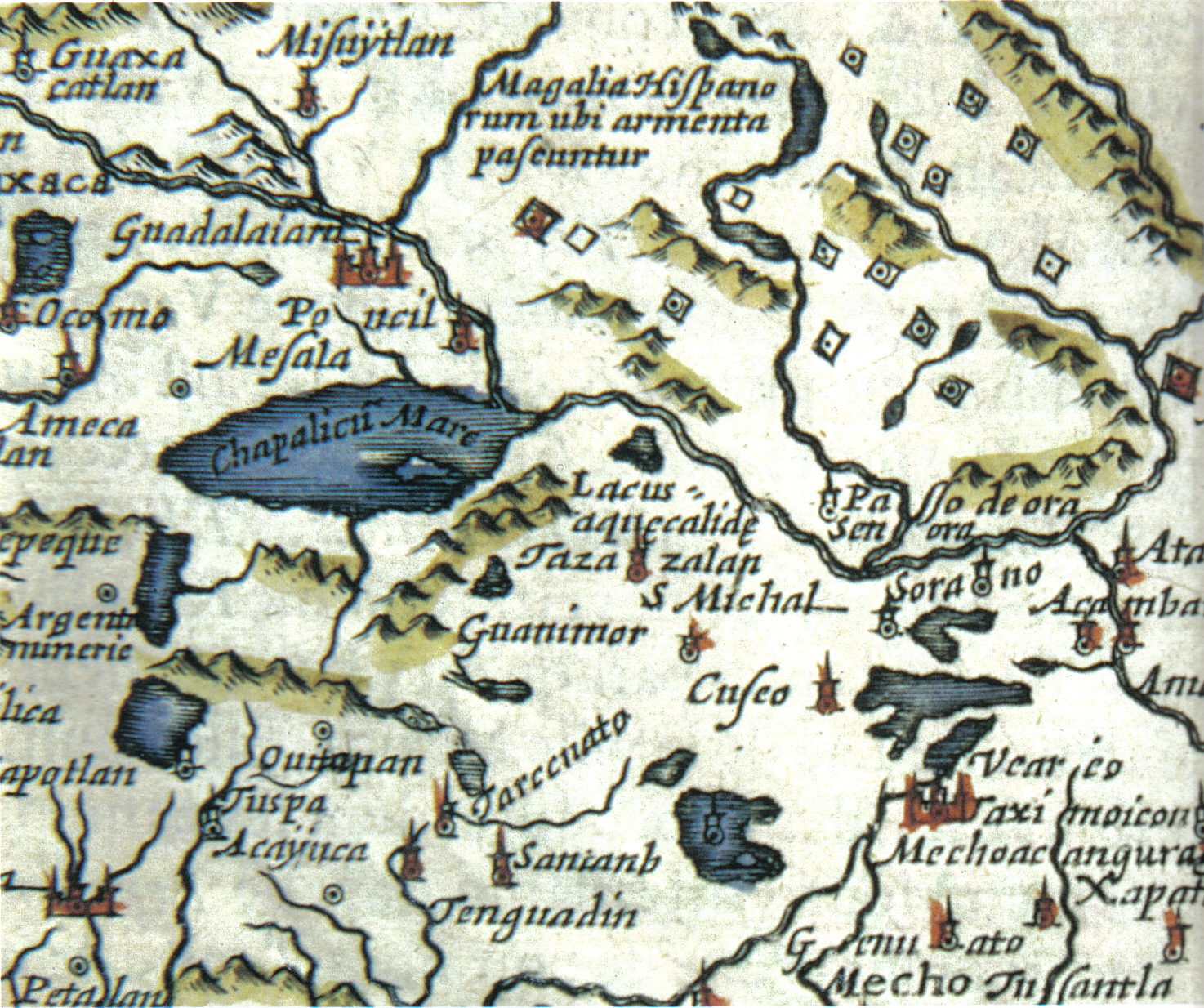
Map of Morelos' overall campaign.

The viceroy of New Spain, Francisco Xavier Venegas, in an effort to avert an assault on Mexico City, sent Calleja at the head of 5,000 soldiers to hold Morelos and his forces in the area around Cuautla. Calleja fortified the area around Pasulco as he scrutinized the area around Cuautla for potential avenues of attack. Morelos, Galeana, Nicolás Bravo, and the larger insurgent army arrived to garrison the city on 31 January 1812. One Spanish farmer named Mateo Musitu attempted to attack the rebels with a cannon named el Matamorelos (the Morelos killer), but he was defeated by Galeana. After entering the city, Morelos promptly executed 50 royalist soldiers and gave a speech that sought to gain sympathy amongst the people with the goal of gaining supporters in his efforts to achieve a breakthrough to the capital of the viceroyalty.

Leonardo Bravo began an extensive trench fortification network around Cuautla and ordered that loopholes be made in the convent and many of the principal buildings. Whilst Bravo was fortifying the town, Morelos went about procuring food and equipment for his troops. At this time, the rebel forces numbered around 2,000 infantry and 1,000 cavalry who were commanded directly by Francisco Ayala and Colonel Cano respectively. The rebels had 16 pieces of artillery, amongst them was el Niño which was property of the Galeana brothers and was used in some of the festivals thrown at Cuautla. On the morning of 10 February, the rebels learned of Calleja's arrival to Cuautla, causing Galeana to leave the fort and to fortify the town and the Convent of San Diego. Leonardo Bravo commanded the forces from Santo Domingo and Mariano Matamoros together with Victor Bravo took command over the trenches south of the town. Morelos dedicated himself to the inspection of his troops, the transportation of provisions and the watch over the northern part of the city.

On 18 February, Calleja began his first attack on Cuautla with around 5,000 troops. A few days later, 7,000 reinforcement loyalists troops arrived under the command of Ciriaco del Llano and José Gabriel de Armijo from Asturias, Guanajuato, Lovera, San Luis Potosí, Zamora and Tulancingo. Calleja attacked the Loma de San Diego with about 500 soldiers with the goal of creating an observation post overlooking the city. Morelos observed this from the loma of Cuautlixco, half a league away from Cuautla and made an attempt to stop the Spanish attack. Matamoros and Bravo tried to dissuade Morelos, but the general won the argument by stating that his purpose was to merely test the enemy. Calleja observed the insurgent movements and prepared two cannons to repel their attack. These cannons were destroyed by the forces of Morelos, but Calleja's observation force was able to completely rout Morelos' force who retreated to Cuautla, a great many of the rebels being taken prisoner or killed. Upon hearing this news, Galeana, together with 50 insurgent soldiers launched his own battle to rescue Morelos' beleaguered soldiers. Morelos himself was almost taken prisoner, but one of Galeana's soldiers saved him and brought him back to Cuautla.

At around 7:00 am on 19 February, four columns of royalist soldiers left the camp of Calvario marching in the direction of the Convent of San Diego. Two of the columns dispersed, one to the left and the other to the right to form a pincer attack on the rebel position with the other two columns attacking from the front. Each column marched with one artillery piece. The columns marched with the regiments placed on the flanks and in the center, Calleja rode to battle leading his troops from a chariot. Morelos, realizing that an attack was imminent, gave the order that the rebels were not to fire upon the Spanish troops until they had reached the outskirts of the city. He placed Galeana at the vanguard of his defensive forces.

== The battle ==
When the royalist army advanced to a position north of Calle Real, almost reaching the Plaza of San Diego, the rebels opened fire and the battle began. Hermenegildo Galeana launched his forces at the royalist attackers. A Spanish Colonel named Sagarra, upon seeing Galeana and recognizing him as one of the rebel leaders, offered single combat. Sagarra fired his pistol at Galeana, missing his target. Galeana returned fire and killed Sagarra in one shot. Galeana ordered his nephew Pablo Galeana to continue to hold the royalist forces. After some time, the insurgent position was gradually weakened and the following cry was heard: todo se ha perdido, han derrotado al general Galeana (English: all is lost, they have routed General Galeana).

The rebel soldiers, under the command of Captain Larios, fled to the city plaza. A troop of royalist dragoons were at one point in a position to take the city center when a 12‑year-old boy named Narciso Mendoza fired a cannon into them, dispersing them. After this period of fighting, Morelos visited each individual house that had been attacked giving money and supplies to the affected parties. It was here that Morelos realized that if he was able to decisively win this battle, it would mean that he would be free to march on Mexico City.

After the failed initial attack on Cuautla, Calleja wrote to Viceroy Venegas confirming that Cuautla was defended by around 12,000 insurgents and that it was impossible to take the city with his current force and would instead opt to besiege the city. That night, he gathered a war council to discuss their options. The next day, Calleja contacted the Ministry of War with their decision, they would impose a siege on the city for a period of six to eight days. They further solicited reinforcements be sent so that they could effectively seal the city off (a distance of about a league).

On 22 February, a message was intercepted by the rebels which detailed the size of Calleja's force and the plans to besiege the city. After seeing this letter, Morelos decided to break out of the city but was held up by Galeana who suspected that the letter was a trick laid out by Calleja. After a meeting of the rebel leaders, they decided to remain in the city.

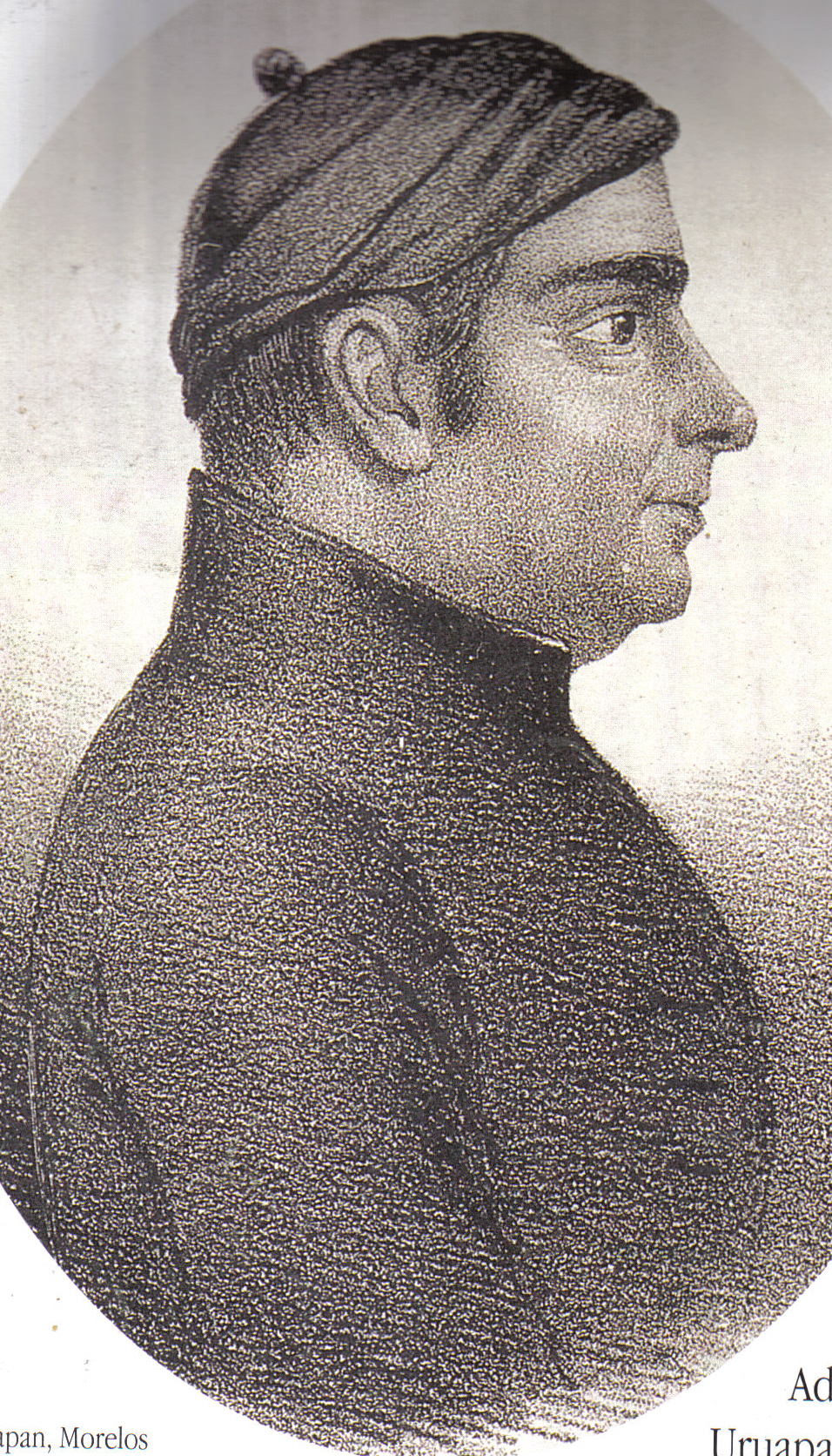
José María Morelos, leader of the rebel forces at the Siege of Cuautla.

On 23 February, Ciriaco del Llano entered Izúcar and managed to advance all the way to the Cerro del Calvario. From here, he mounted a series of cannon bombardments for a period of two hours directed at Cuautla. After this he sent two columns of cavalry under the command of Colonel José Antonio Andrade. The attack was repulsed by a priest, Father Sánchez and by Vicente Guerrero. The following day, the royalists attempted a new attack that was likewise repulsed. After this attack, the royalists retreated to Izúcar where they pillaged and burned the neighborhoods of Santiago and El Calvario. Thereafter they commenced a new bombardment of the city center.

The same day, Llano received an order from Venegas telling him to join forces with Callega at the royalist camp outside of Cuautla. After leaving behind a sizable portion of his munitions and taking a path around the Popocatépetl Volcano, Llano entered the Tierra Caliente on 28 February. Morelos decided to delay the arrival of these reinforcements and sent a sizable force under José Antonio Galeana to occupy the Barranca de Tlayacac with orders to ambush Llano's army. These orders were changed at the last minute and the surprise force was placed under the command of Manuel de Ordiera. The operation became known to Calleja who decided to send a counterattack force under the command of Captain Anastasio Bustamante. Bustamante was able to surprise the rebel ambush force and routed them, allowing for Llano's forces (2,000 soldiers) to pass unscathed to Calleja's camp on the morning of 1 March.

Once Calleja's forces were gathered, he began his encirclement of Cuautla. The headquarters for the siege was located at the Buenavista Hacienda. The battalions from Asturias and Lovera guarded the city from the barranco de "Agua Hedionda", named as such due to its abundance of sulfuric waters. The Spanish built a bridge that stretched two leagues through this area to head off any line of escape from the city.

Morelos fortified the hacienda Buenavista and the area known as "El Platanar", which was surrounded by Llano's forces. Between 1 March and 9 March, Galeana was tasked with the defense of this area. On 10 March, he was finally able to scupper the royalist forces at Zacatepec. That same day, a new bombardment of the city began and Llano was in a position to enter the city. Nicolás Bravo however was able to detain his forces and Matamoros made his escape from the city. On 13 March, Calleja wrote the following letter to the viceroy:

Cuento hoy, 13 de marzo a las seis de la mañana, cuatro días que sufre el enemigo como pudiera una guarnición de las tropas más bizarras sin dar ningún indicio de abandonar la defensa. Todos los días amanecen reparadas las pequeñas brechas que es capaz de abrir mi artillería de batalla: la escasez de agua la ha suplido con pozos, la de víveres con maíz que tiene en abundancia.

After many months of resistance, Matamoros was able to escape from Cuautla towards Toluca where López Rayón was waiting with a variety of supplies needed to sustain the rebel defense. The rebel force was ambushed by Spanish forces and although Matamoros escaped without capture, they were unable to obtain any of the supplies for their beleaguered comrades.

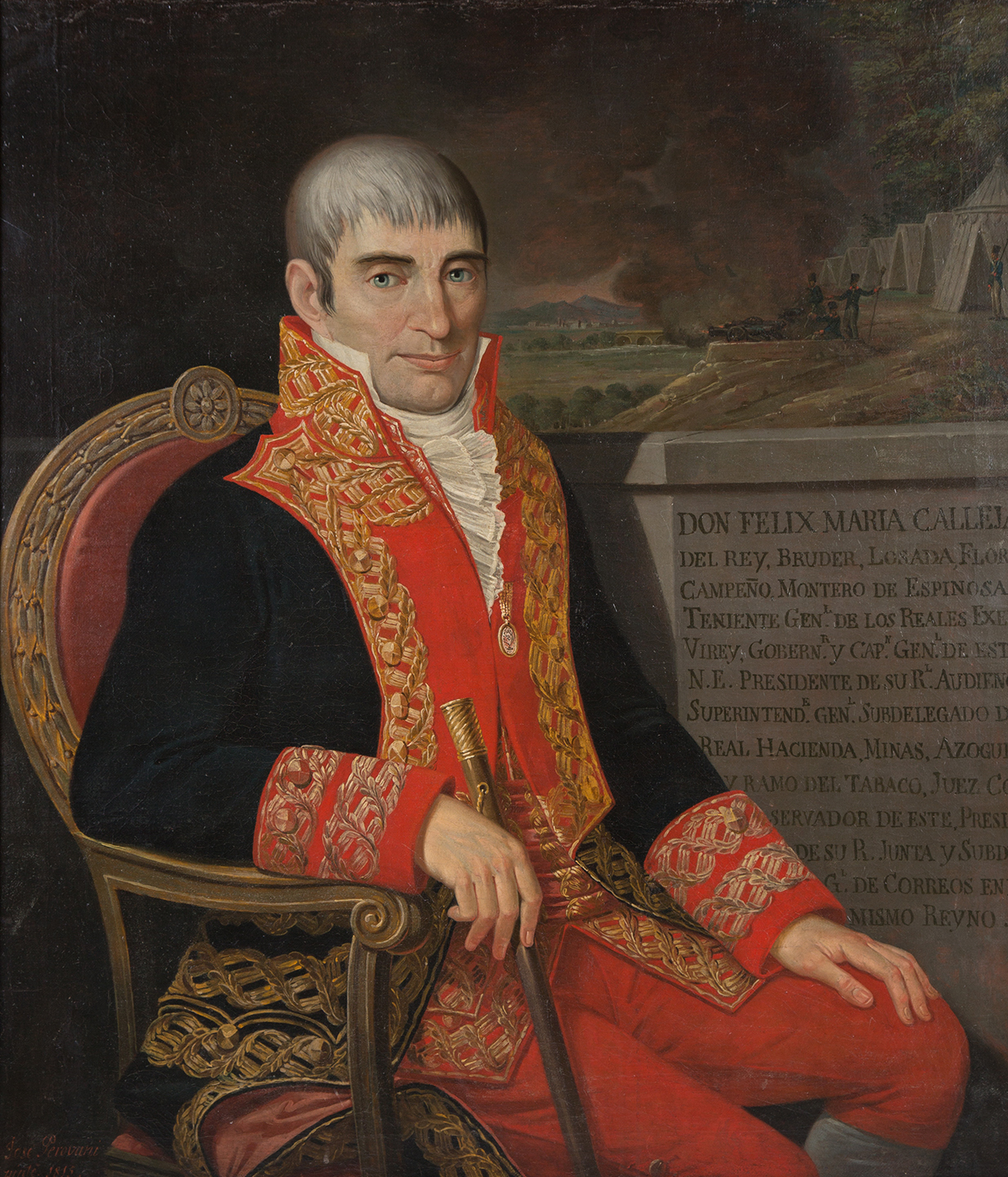
Spanish General Félix María Calleja del Rey, the royalist commander during the actions at Cuautla. In 1813, he would be made the Viceroy of New Spain.

Calleja attempted various other assaults on the fortified city but was altogether unsuccessful. At the end of April, the situation became unsustainable and the royalist leadership asked Calleja not try to assault Cuautla again. At midday on 2 May, Calleja wrote the viceroy with his intentions to abandon the siege. That night, the insurgents decided to abandon the city. Being as the rebels were affected with a high level of disease (over half), Morelos and Galeana sent an emissary to the Spanish camp who returned with news that many of the Spaniards were sleeping and others were busy guarding the supplies. They decided to abandon the city and in less than four hours, the entire rebel army had left. Both sides inevitably claimed victory in this battle although shortly after their abandonment of the city, Morelos' army was completely routed and broken as a fighting force by the Spanish.

== Consequences ==
The insurgents abandoned the city and on the morning of 2 May, Calleja gathered his forces and occupied the city.

Calleja was recalled to the capital for an interview with Venegas who offered him a temporary return to Spain to fight in the Peninsula War. Calleja refused the offer and instead decided to return to Cuernavaca which he left in December of the same year to take command of Spanish forces in Mexico City. In March 1813, Venegas was retired as Viceroy of New Spain by members of the provisional council of government in Seville. In his place, Calleja was named as the new Viceroy. From this post, Calleja directed the forces to defeat Morelos and was relieved by Ferdinand VII of Spain in 1816.

Morelos and his fellow leaders were hunted down by the royalists. The rebel movement was forced to flee to the south of the country where they attempted to take the city of Acapulco de Juárez, the main port connecting New Spain to the Philippines and other Spanish possessions in Asia. Leonardo Bravo was captured at the hacienda of the Terrateniente, Gabriel de Yermo and was presented to Calleja who authorised his transfer to Mexico City for trial and execution. Morelos, in an attempt to free his fellow rebel, offered a deal that would liberate all Spanish prisoners from the Siege of Cuautla (more than 200) in exchange for Bravo. Bravo was executed on 13 September at the Paseo de Bucareli with a garrote and Morelos ordered the execution all 200 Spanish prisoners from Cuautla by Leonardo's son, Nicolás Bravo. The younger Bravo decided instead to liberate the prisoners, giving rise to his nickname, the "Caudillo Magnánimo".

Valerio Trujano was around this time besieged by royalist forces at Huajuapan. When Morelos was informed of this development, he marched all the way to Oaxaca to relieve Trujano. When he arrived on 25 October, Trujano had already resisted for over 100 days. with Morales' help, the rebels were able to rout the royalist forces. On 27 October, the rebels gave chase to the retreating royalist forces. Trujano was killed in this series of conflicts as the royalists were relieved by a secondary force of Spanish soldiers. Morelos gathered Trujano's forces and marched on Antequera de Oaxaca. On 25 November, he was able to occupy the city, finalizing the campaign of 1812.

== See also ==
- Cuautla, Morelos
- Félix María Calleja
- Francisco Xavier Venegas
- Hermenegildo Galeana
- José María Larios
- José María Morelos
- Mariano Matamoros
- Mexican War of Independence
