= Leonardo Bravo (general officer) =

Mexican liberal, landowner, and general

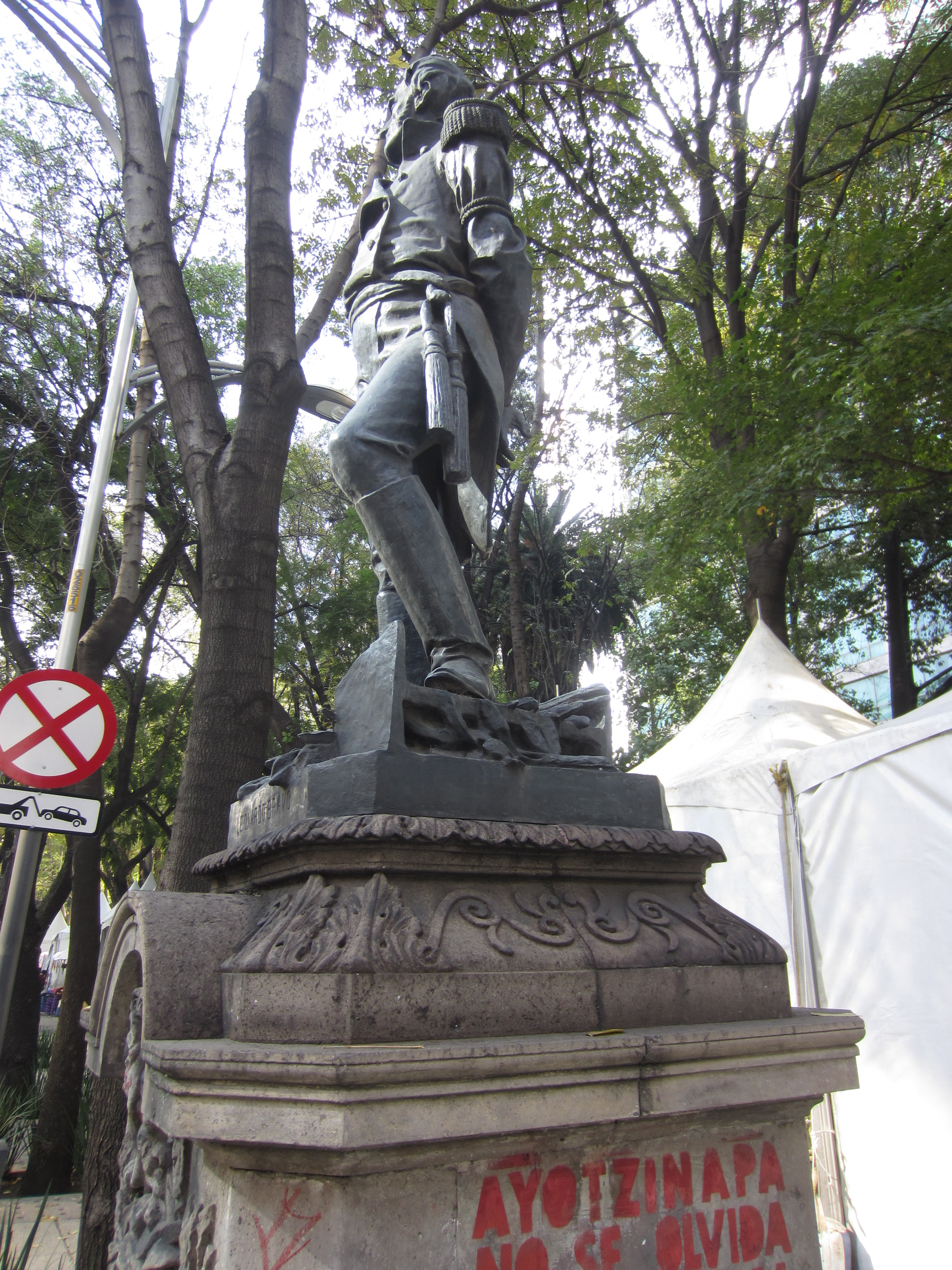
Statue in Mexico City, 2018

Leonardo Bravo (1764 – September 13, 1812) was a Mexican liberal, landowner, and general. He was the brother of Máximo Bravo and father of Nicolás Bravo. Bravo participated with the insurgent faction during the development of the armed movement of the first stage of the Independence of Mexico.

== Early life ==
Leonardo Bravo was born in Chilpancingo, Guerrero, the eldest son of a wealthy Spanish family devoted to agriculture and mining as the owner of the Hacienda of Chichihualco. He married Gertrudis Rueda, and they had a son (Nicolás) and two daughters. The Bravos were known for supporting the local festivities surrounding the Feast of Saint Francis of Assisi.

== War of Independence ==
When the Mexican War of Independence started in 1810, he, his son Nicolás Bravo, and his four brothers Miguel, Víctor, Máximo and Casimiro refused to work with the Spanish royalists.

Hermenegildo Galeana, acting on the orders of José María Morelos and Pavón, requested material support from the Bravos. As they started to comply, royalist troops advanced on the Bravo hacienda, precipitating the so-called batalla de los encuerados (battle of the naked) as son Nicolás had joined the fight while bathing in a river on May 3, 1811. Leonardo's youngest brother Casmiro stayed to managed the family's property, but the rest of the men joined Morelos. They fought at Chilpancingo, Tixtla, and Chilapa. Leonardo explored caves in search of saltpeter to make gunpowder, handled documents, and performed other logistical work. In November 1811 he joined the campaign in Izúcar, capturing a number of prisoners on December 17.

The Siege of Cuautla began on December 25; Leonardo organized the defense around the church of San Diego. When the insurgents broke the siege on May 2, 1812, Bravo, Lieutenant Colonel Manuel Sosa, José Mariano de la Piedra, and 20 poorly armed soldiers, moved to the San Gabriel hacienda, owned by the royalist Gabriel J. de Yermo. Leonardo was captured by the Spanish forces on May 6.

== Execution ==
Following Bravo's capture at the Hacienda of San Gabriel Las Palmas, the government demanded his five sons surrender, promising to spare the life of their father, Leonardo, in return. However, such offerings from the Viceroy were questionable, as other insurgents who had accepted similar offers, such as the Orduña family, had been executed by the royalists.

Morelos did not wish to impose his authority on the feelings of Nicolás Bravo, so he wrote to the Viceroy offering 800 Spanish prisoners as exchange for the life of Leonardo. However, Viceroy Francisco Javier Venegas did not accept the proposal. Leonardo Bravo and his associates, Mariano Piedras and Manuel Pérez, were condemned to death by vile garrotte, considered one of the most infamous and degrading ways to die. They were executed on November 13, 1812, in Mexico City.

Morelos ordered Nicolás Bravo to execute 300 royalist prisoners in response to the actions of the Viceroy. The younger Bravo explained to the prisoners the fate of his father and the order that he had to fulfill. However, he told the Spaniards "Quedais en Libertad" ("You are now free"). The majority of the prisoners then decided to join his army.

== Legacy ==
Leonardo Bravo was survived by his wife Gertrudis Rueda, his son Nicolás, his brothers Miguel, Víctor, Máximo, Casimiro, his sister-in-law Gertrudis Villaso, and his nephew Calixto.

The municipality Leonardo Bravo, in Guerrero, where the Bravos had their hacienda, was named after him. There is an Instituto Leonardo Bravo in Tlalnepantla de Baz, State of Mexico. The capital of Guerrero state is officially called Chilpancingo de los Bravo in honor of the family. There is a statue of Leonardo Bravo on Paseo de la Reforma in Mexico City.

On June 19, 1823, Nicolás Bravo was declared Benemerito of Mexico ("Meritorious of Mexico") by the Congress.

== Bibliography ==
- BERBERA Editores (2004). Cien breves biografías de mexicanos célebres. Berbera editores. ISBN 968-5275-40-8
