= Tecpan de Galeana (municipality) =

Municipality in the Mexican state of Guerrero

- Municipality
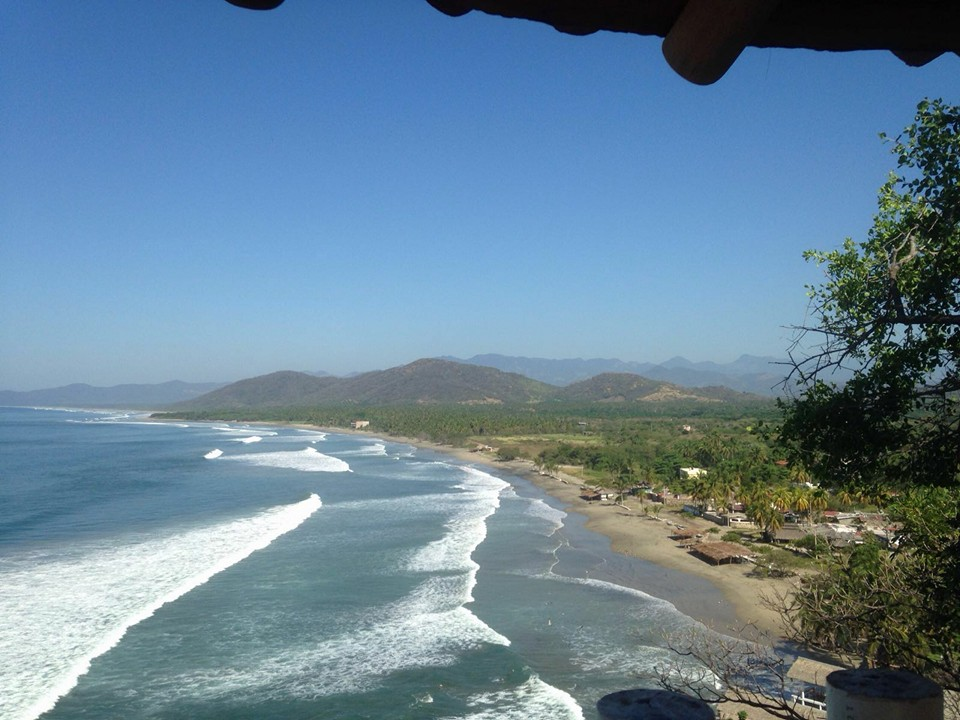
- Playa Cayaquitos in Tecpan

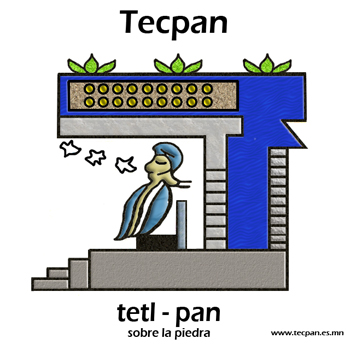
- Coat of arms

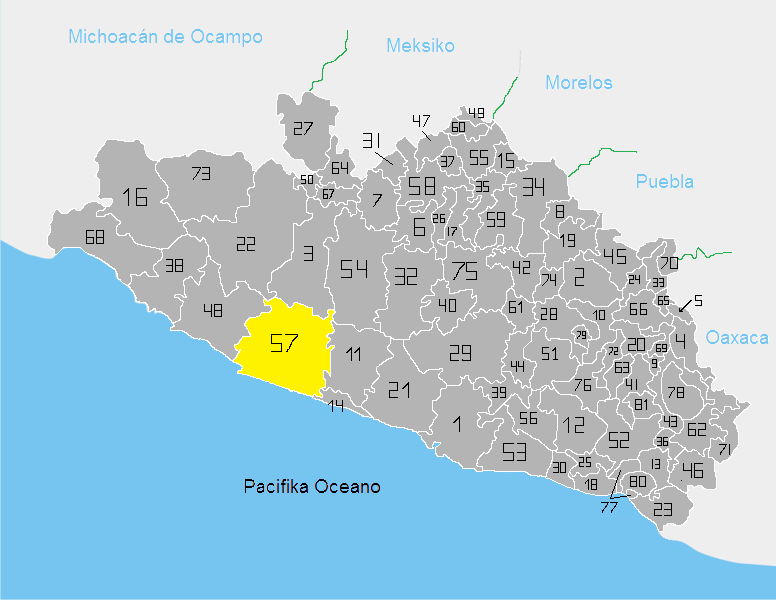
- Location of the municipality in the state

- Location within Mexico Location within Guerrero
- Coordinates: 17°07′N 100°28′W
- Country: Mexico
- State: Guerrero
- Municipal seat: Tecpan de Galeana

Area
  - Total: 2,537.8 km^{2} (979.9 sq mi)

Population (2020)
  - Total: 65,237
- Time zone: UTC-6 (Central)
- Postal code: 40900
- Area code: 742
- Website: ayuntamientotecpan.gob.mx

Tecpan de Galeana (for Hermenegildo Galeana) is a municipality in the Mexican state of Guerrero. The municipal seat lies at Tecpan de Galeana. The municipality covers an area of 2,537.8 km^{2} (979.9 sq mi).

In 2020, the municipality had a total population of 65,237, up from 52,848 in 2005.

== See also ==
- Hurricane Tara (1961), which caused extensive damage in the municipality
- Mexican Federal Highway 200, on which Tecpan stands
