= Battle of Almolonga =

1823 battle in Mexico

- Part of the Casa Mata Plan Revolution
Date	13 January 1823
Location	Almolonga, Guerrero
Result	Imperialist Victory

Belligerents
(Mexico) Republicans	(Mexico) Imperialist

Commanders and leaders
(Mexico) Vicente Guerrero (WIA) (Mexico) Nicolas Bravo	(Mexico) José Gabriel de Armijo (Mexico) Epitacio Sánchez †

Strength
(Mexico) Republican Army	Imperial Army

The Battle of Almolonga was a military action during the First Mexican Empire on January 13, 1823 (Note: however Francisco de Paula y Arrangoiz assures that the incident occurred on January 25 and not January 13, as documented) in the town of Almolonga, between the hills of Teposteyo and Ahuacopexco, in the state of Guerrero during the revolution in favor of the Veracruz Plan in order to put an end to the Mexican Empire.

== Background ==
The rebels commanded by Gral. Vicente Guerrero and Nicolás Bravo were defeated by the imperial forces commanded by Gral. José Gabriel de Armijo. Emperor Agustín de Iturbide did not hesitate to send General José Gabriel de Armijo to the command of all the forces of the South, since he, as an ex-royalist military, had had experience fighting against Guerreros forces as in the Battle of Cerro de Barrabás.

== Battle ==
During the battle, finishing his passage through the imperial company of Jiutepec, which Guerrero faced directly, being shot in the lung, and, believing him dead, his troops began to flee in disorder. In order to realize the imperial victory, along with Gen. Epitacio Sánchez advanced the cavalry, however in the first meetings, General Sánchez was shot dead in the head. The death of the chief generated the slow withdrawal, abandoning his artillery, without which the rebels could get the loot because they escaped. Guerrero was rescued by a soldier on horseback, hid it in a ravine, and then recovered at the home of a local Indian, becoming ill all his life. Bravo withdrew with the few troops that had not escaped Putla. In the part of José Gabriel de Armijo who sent from Chilapa declared Guerrero dead, ending his campaign.
