= Tecpan de Galeana =

City in the Mexican state of Guerrero

- Municipal seat and city
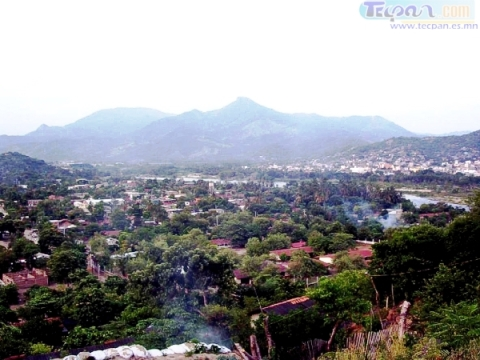

- Location in Mexico Tecpan de Galeana (Mexico)
- Coordinates: 17°15′N 100°41′W
- Country: Mexico
- State: Guerrero
- Municipality: Tecpan de Galeana

Population (2020)
  - Total: 16,447
- Time zone: UTC-6 (Central)
- Postal code: 40900
- Area code: 742
- Website: ayuntamientotecpan.gob.mx

Tecpan de Galeana (named after Hermenegildo Galeana) is a city and seat of the municipality of Tecpan de Galeana, in the state of Guerrero, in southern Mexico.
