= Agua Hedionda Spa =

Geothermal feature in Morelos, Mexico

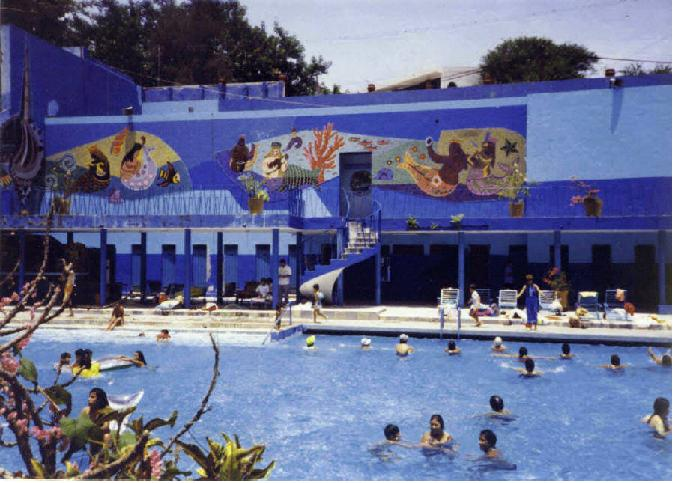
Agua Hedionda

The Spa of Agua Hedionda (Spanish: Balneario de Agua Hedionda) is a mineral spring and day spa located in the city of Cuautla, in the state of Morelos, Mexico, about 60 miles (97 km) south of Mexico City.

Agua Hedionda means in Spanish "foul-smelling water", and is also the name of the residential neighborhood around the spa, with approximately 10,000 inhabitants. The name was likely due to sulfur in the water.

== Sulfur spring ==
The waters originate from the melting snows of the Popocatepetl and Ixtaccihuatl volcanoes. It is probable that the spring was visited since antiquity by the Olmecs, the Teotihuacans, the Chalca tribe, the Tlahuica tribe, and the Aztecs. Chemical analysis of the waters was made in the late 19th century and the current spa premises of Agua Hedionda were built by the Mexican government in 1928.

Agua Hedionda is a popular tourist attraction with ancient trees and gardens, with many types of birds. There are 2 large swimming pools (240 x 60 feet (18 m) and 120 x 60 feet), 8 small pools that can be rented for private use, a restaurant, a convenience store, and locked cubicles for the changing of clothes. It is open 365 days a year. The water is slightly warm (about 80-82^ F) and the spring's output surpasses 200 gallons per second.

== Medical properties ==
Agua Hedionda's water is rich in sulfur.
