= Benita Galeana =

Mexican writer, feminist and activist

Benita Galeana Lacunza (10 September 1903, in San Jeronimo de Juarez – 17 April 1995, in Mexico City) was a writer, feminist, suffragist, unionist and Mexican activist who supported women's rights and worker's rights. She was an active figure in the social justice movements in Mexico during the second half of the twentieth century.

== Life ==
Galeana was a member of the Mexican Communist Party beginning in 1927 and a member of the Unified Socialist Party of Mexico after the dissolution of the former. Galeana participated in political activism that expanded the standard eight-hour work day in Mexico. This work included the establishment of a legal statute and social security. Galeana was a promoter of trade unions and of strikes emanating from a variety of sectors.

Galeana was a pioneer of the Mexican feminist movement and fought for the rights for women to vote, nurseries, the right to abortions and the right to maternity leave. This work occurred together with Tina Modoti, Frida Kahlo and Adelina Zendejas, among others and regarding a variety of feminist matters. This group of mothers and intellectuals founded various organizations in their country. Among the women of the United Pro-Women's Rights Front, Galeana's work converted her to be one of the most important in the fight for equality of women's political rights.
