= Puruarán =

- Location within Michoacán Location within Mexico
- Coordinates: 19°5′40″N 101°31′19″W
- Country: Mexico
- State: Michoacán
- Municipality: Turicato

Population (2020)
  - Total: 9,743
- Time zone: UTC-6 (Central)

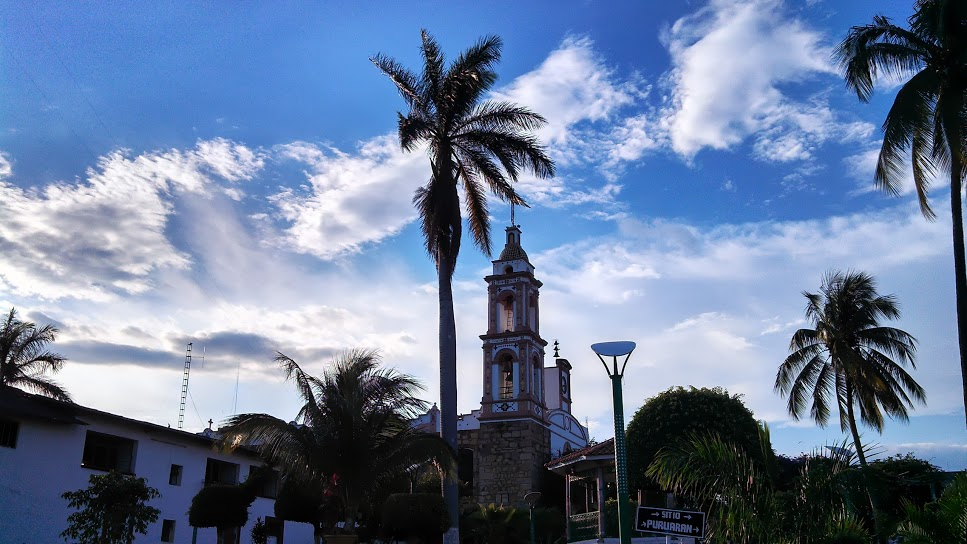
Puruarán Main Square

Puruarán is an inhabited place in Mexico. It is located in the municipality of Turicato in the state of Michoacán, in the western part of the country, 250 km west of the capital Mexico City. Puruarán is situated 1,117 meters above sea level and the number of inhabitants is 7,162.

The terrain around Puruarán is somewhat mountainous. The highest point nearby is Cerro Nombre de Dios, 1,655 meters above sea level, 3.8 km west of Puruarán.The area around Puruarán is quite sparsely populated, with 45 inhabitants per square kilometer. The nearest larger community is Tacámbaro de Codallos, 16,8 km north of Puruarán. In the surroundings around Puruarán, mainly savannah forest grows.

== Sources ==
- Geonames
- Inegi
