= Battle of Puruarán =

1814 battle of the War of Mexican Independence

- Part of the Mexican War of Independence
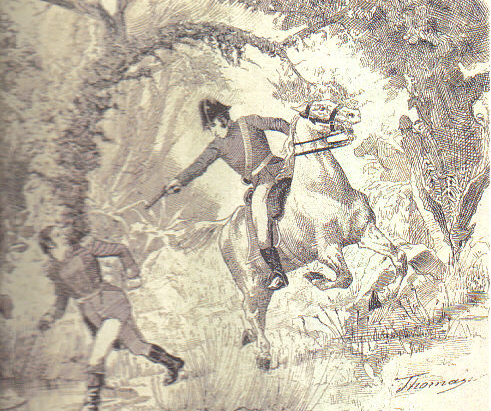
- A painting of the capture of Mariano Matamoros y Guridi by the royalist soldier, Eusebio Rodríguez at the Battle of Puruarán.
Date	5 January 1814
Location	Puruarán, Michoacán, Mexico
Result	Spanish Royalist victory

Belligerents
Mexican Rebels	Spanish Empire

Commanders and leaders
Mariano Matamoros y Guridi (POW)	Agustín Iturbide; Ciriaco del Llano

Strength
1,000 soldiers	Unknown

Casualties and losses
660; 23 cannons 1,000 muskets	Unknown (low)

The Battle of Puruarán took place during the War of Mexican Independence on 5 January 1814 in the area around Puruarán, Michoacán. The battle was fought between the royalist forces loyal to the Spanish crown and the Mexican rebels fighting for independence from the Spanish Empire. The Mexican insurgents were commanded by Mariano Matamoros y Guridi and the Spanish by Agustín Cosme Damián de Iturbide y Arámburu who would later go on to become the Mexican emperor, and by Ciriaco del Llano. The battle lasted approximately one hour and resulted in a victory for the Spanish Royalists.

== The battle ==
This short battle was a complete loss for the Mexican rebels. After a battle lasting about an hour, the smaller royalist army soundly defeated the Mexican rebels inflicting heavy casualties. The Mexican commander, Mariano Matamoros was captured whilst attempting to flee the field of battle by a loyalist cadet named Eusebio Rodríguez. In addition to losing a majority of their army, the Mexicans also lost 23 artillery pieces and around 1,000 muskets to the Spanish.

== Aftermath ==
After taking stock of their tremendous losses, the Mexican rebels attempted to bargain for the life of General Matamoros who had been the second in command of José María Morelos' forces. They petitioned the government of the Spanish Viceroyalty for a prisoner exchange where they would return 200 captured royalist soldiers for Matamoros. The Spanish refused the offer and ordered the execution by firing squad of Matamoros on 3 February 1814.

After the death of Matamoros, José María Morelos ordered the execution of all 200 Spanish royalist prisoners.

== See also ==
- Mexican War of Independence
- Mariano Matamoros y Guridi
- José María Morelos

== Bibliography ==
- Bustamante, Carlos María de (1846). Cuadro histórico de la revolución mexicana, comenzada en 15 de septiembre de 1810 por el ciudadano Miguel Hidalgo y Costilla, Cura del pueblo de los Dolores (in Spanish). México DF: Impr. de JM Lara.
