= José Antonio Andrade =

José Antonio Andrade was a Peninsular Spanish colonel who notably commanded royalist forces during the Mexican War of Independence. Amongst his more famous battles, he commanded troops in the Siege of Cuautla and the Capture of Orizaba, neither of which resulted in victory for the Spanish Crown.

== See also ==
- Mexican War of Independence
- Siege of Cuautla

== Bibliography ==
- Marley, David (2008). Wars of the Americas: A Chronology of Armed Conflict in the Western Hemisphere, 1492 to the Present. Vol. 1 (2, illustrated, revised ed.). ABC-CLIO. ISBN 978-1-59884-100-8.
