= Hortensia Galeana Sánchez =

Mexican mathematician

Hortensia Galeana Sánchez (born 6 November 1955) is a Mexican mathematician specializing in graph theory, including graph coloring and the independent dominating sets ("kernels") of directed graphs. She is the director of the Institute of Mathematics at the National Autonomous University of Mexico (UNAM).

== Education and career ==
Galeana is originally from Mexico City. She was educated at UNAM, earning her bachelor's, master's, and doctoral degrees there in 1978, 1981, and 1985 respectively. Her 1985 doctoral dissertation, Algunos resultados en la teoría de núcleos en digráficas, was supervised by Víctor Neumann-Lara.

She has taught at UNAM since 1977 and was named director of the UNAM Institute of Mathematics in 2022.

== Recognition ==
Galeana is a member of the Mexican Academy of Sciences. In 1995 and again in 2015 UNAM gave her their National University Prize.
