= Ciriaco del Llano =

Ciriaco del Llano was a Peninsular Spanish General who notably commanded royalist forces during the Mexican War of Independence. Amongst his more famous battles, he commanded troops in the Siege of Cuautla.

He was born in 1756 Abanto (Somorrostro). Enter the Spanish Navy in 1775. Reach the rank of frigate captain. Later brigadier of the royal armies of Spain.

At the outbreak of the Mexican War of Independence, Llano was a naval captain in command of a frigate. In August 1811, he participated in his first campaign against the Mexican insurgents where he handily defeated them at the Battle of Llanos de Apan. For his success in that engagement, he was promoted to the rank of colonel. His forces were later routed at the Battle of Izúcar in February 1812 by Mexican rebels under the command of Mariano Matamoros. Llano again distinguished himself at the Siege of Cuautla in 1812, gaining promotion to the rank of Brigadier.

He was assigned as quartermaster of Puebla for a time after the Siege of Cuatla. Shortly thereafter, he was given command of an army and defeated a rebel army under the command of Mariano Matamoros at the Battle of Puruarán in January 1814. Llano's forces successfully captured Matamoros who was tried and executed shortly after that battle.

In 1815, as chief general of the expeditionary corps at Cerro de Cóporo, Llano was forced to retreat after an unsuccessful attack.

From 1816 - 1821 he was the Intendant of Puebla. He was besieged at Puebla by a rebel army under the command of Nicolás Bravo in July 1821 and was obliged again to surrender his forces together with Agustín de Iturbide, the future emperor of Mexico who was at that time fighting for the Spanish Crown. As per the terms of this agreement, all the troops under Llano's command were obliged to be transferred to Havana. After the loss of his army, Ciriaco del Llano returned to Spain.

== See also ==
- Mexican War of Independence
- Siege of Cuautla
