= Hermenegildo Galeana, Puebla =

Coordinates: 19.8473°N 98.0213°W

Hermenegildo Galeana
- Municipality and town
- Location of the municipality in Puebla
- Country: Mexico
- State: Puebla

Population (2020)
  - Total: 7,011
- Time zone: UTC-6 (Zona Centro)

Hermenegildo Galeana is a town and municipality in the Mexican state of Puebla.
