= ARM Hermenegildo Galeana =

ARM Hermenegildo Galeana may refer to one of the following Mexican Navy ships:

- ARM Hermenegildo Galeana (G19), the former American Auk-class minesweeper USS Sage (AM-111); acquired by the Mexican Navy in November 1973; classed as a Valle-class patrol vessel; renamed Mariano Matamoros (P117) to free her name for the former USS Bronstein (FF-1037), c. 1993; in active service
- ARM Hermenegildo Galeana (F202), the former American Bronstein-class frigate USS Bronstein (FF-1037); acquired by the Mexican Navy in November 1993; classed as a Bravo-class frigate; in active service
