= Mariano Matamoros =

Mexican priest (1770–1814)

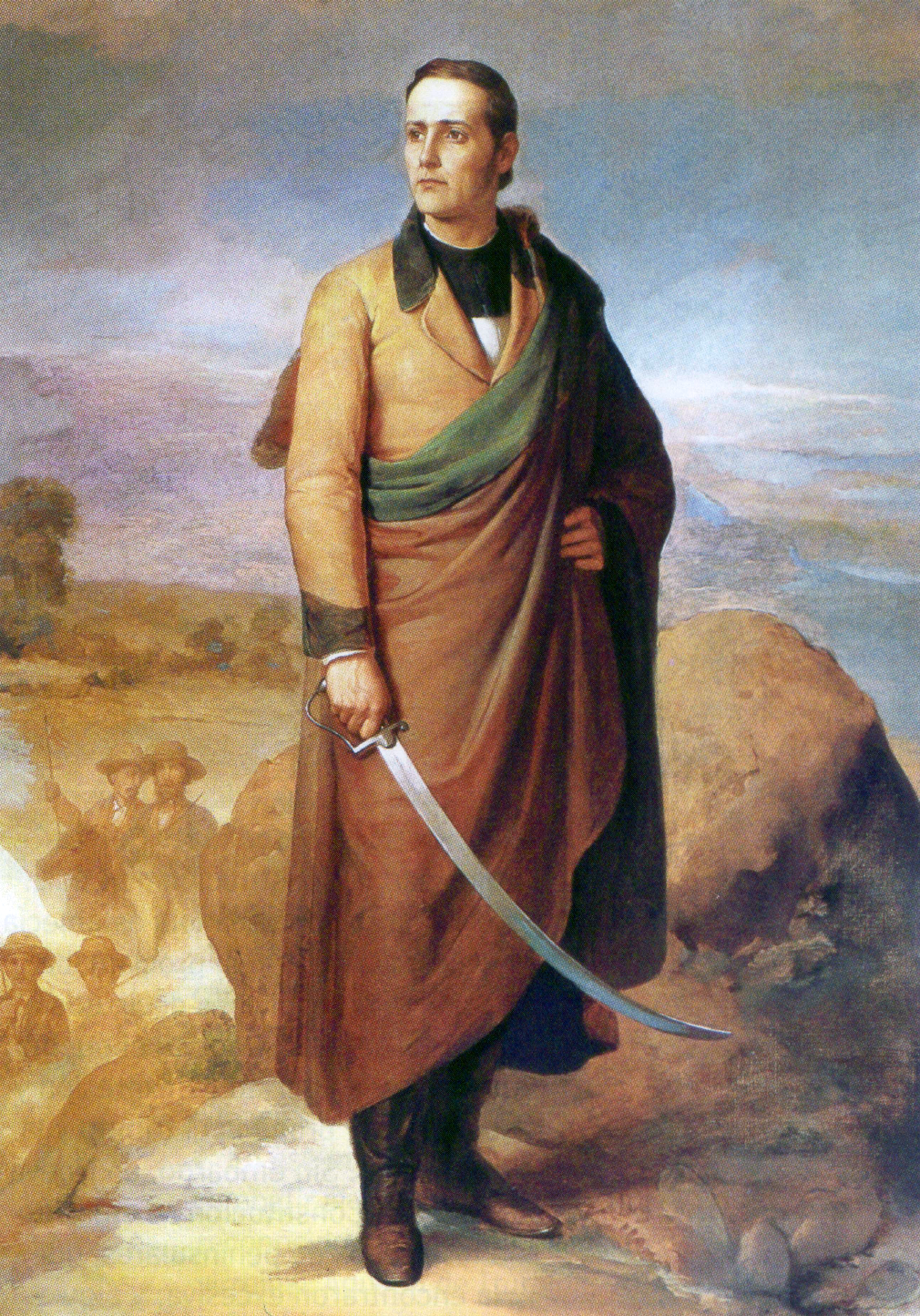
- Portrait of Mariano Matamoros, existing in the National Palace, painted in 1868, by José Obregón
- Born: August 14, 1770; Mexico City, New Spain
- Died: February 3, 1814 (aged 43)
- Allegiance: Mexico
- Branch: Revolutionary army
- Service years: 1811–1814
- Rank: Lieutenant general
- Commands: Mexican War of Independence
- Conflicts: Siege of Cuautla; Battle of Lomas de Santa María; Battle of Puruarán (POW) (executed)

Mariano Matamoros y Guridi (August 14, 1770 – February 3, 1814) was a Mexican priest and revolutionary rebel soldier of the Mexican War of Independence, who fought for independence against Spain in the early 19th century.

== Biography ==
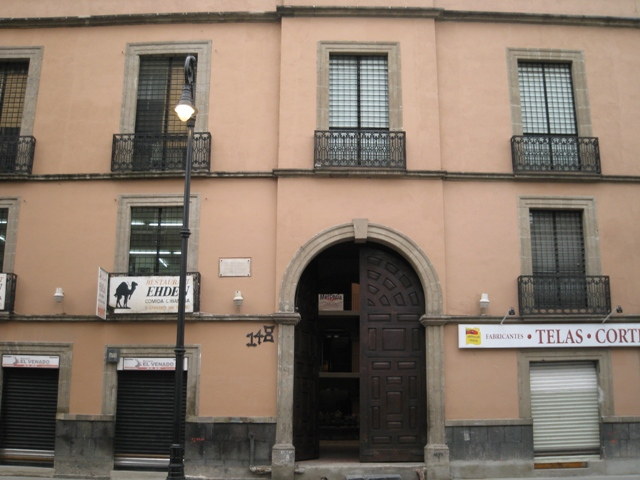
House where Mariano Matamoros was born in the Merced neighborhood

Matamoros was born in Mexico City in 1770. He received a Bachelor of Arts in 1786 and a degree in theology in 1789. He was ordained as a Roman Catholic priest in 1796 and served in several churches around the city. During this time, he started to sympathize with rebellious issues and for this reason, he was jailed by the Spanish colonial authorities shortly after the war started. He managed to escape from prison and eventually joined the revolutionary army of José María Morelos on December 16, 1811.

One day before the Izucar battle, Morelos named him colonel and ordered him to create his own forces. With the population of Jantetelco, Matamoros created two regiments of cavalry, two battalions of infantry and one of artillery; in total his forces were composed of 2000 men.

During the Spanish siege of Cuautla, from February 9 to May 2, 1812, Morelos recognized Matamoros' ability in the battlefield and promoted him to the rank of lieutenant general, effectively making him second in command of the army. One night, Matamoros broke the siege and was able to join Miguel Bravo in Aculco. Once the siege was lifted, the campaign continued in Oaxaca; it was surrounded on November 25 of 1812. Thereafter, Matamoros won more battles, first in Santo Domingo Tonalá against Manuel Lambrini followed by San Juan Coscomatepec and San Agustín del Palmar against the Asturias battalion.

=== Izúcar ===
While serving as parish priest of Jantetelco, he was accused of sympathizing with the ideas of the Creoles in favor of independence, which is why he was reported to the Spanish authorities shortly before the war began. He was able to escape to join the insurgent ranks of the priest José María Morelos y Pavón in Izúcar, on December 16, 1811.

Michoacán

Matamoros was in the Battle of Valladolid close to the city of Valladolid in Michoacán, the present day city of Morelia, where the Spanish army won. After the battle, on 5 January 1814, the army moved to Puruaran. Agustin de Iturbide attacked the Morelos army and it was a disaster; in the middle of the confusion, Matamoros tried to escape crossing the river (close to Puruaran) but was captured by Eusebio Rodríguez, a soldier from the battalion of "Frontera", who received 200 pesos and a promotion.

Allegedly, Morelos offered 200 Spanish prisoners in exchange for Matamoros, but was turned down by the Spanish colonial authorities.

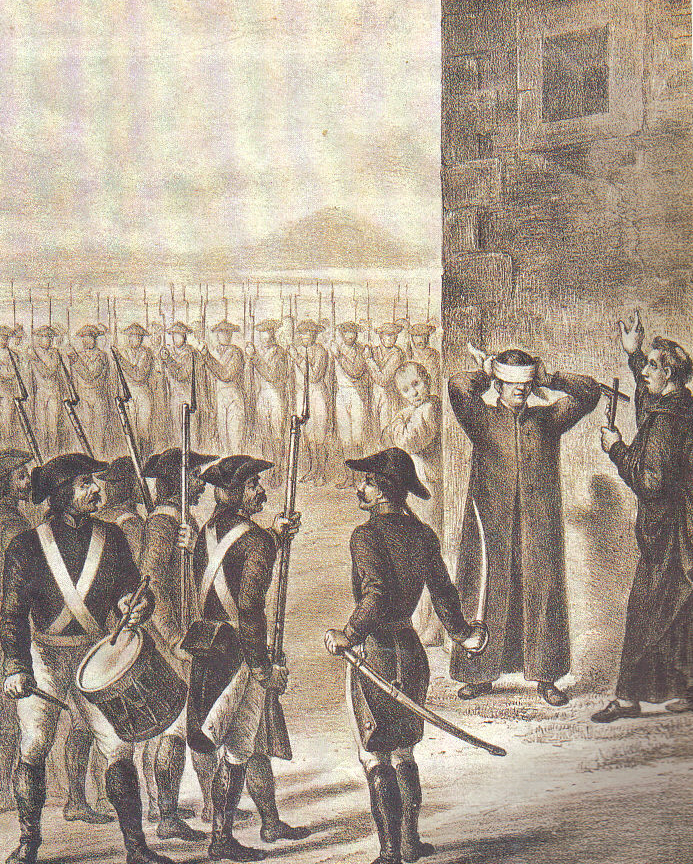
Execution of Matamoros in Valladolid on February 3, 1814.

Matamoros was removed from the priesthood and tried for treason. He was executed by firing squad in Valladolid, Michoacán on February 3, 1814.

== Legacy ==
In 1823, Matamoros was honored as "Benemérito de la Patria". His remains now rest in the Independence Column of Mexico City.

Matamoros is a national hero of Mexico. In his honour, the Cuernavaca International Airport in Cuernavaca, Morelos, is named after him, as well as the cities of Izúcar de Matamoros, Puebla; Matamoros, Coahuila de Zaragoza; and Matamoros, Tamaulipas.

== See also ==
- History of Mexico
- Viceroyalty of New Spain
