= Hermenegildo Galeana =

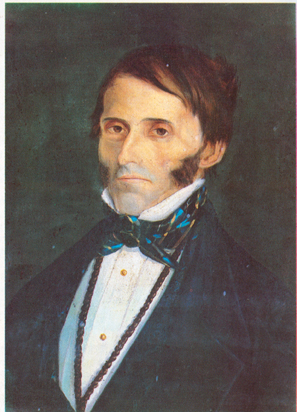
- Galeana
- Born: 13 April 1762; Tecpan (in modern-day Guerrero)
- Died: 27 June 1814 (aged 52); Coyuca (in modern-day Guerrero)
- Occupation: Military commander in the mexican War of Independence
- Years active: 1811–1814

Hermenegildo Galeana (13 April 1762 – 27 June 1814) was a hero of the Mexican War of Independence, one of six brothers who fought in the insurgency. Galeana was considered the right-hand man of secular priest and leader of independence, José María Morelos and was the immediate superior of insurgent fighter Vicente Guerrero. Galeana's family were landholders and "family name is said to be hispanicized from English", with the founder in Mexico being an English pirate who jumped ship, marrying a local woman. His portrait shows him as light-complected in a region with many dark morenos. Galeana died in battle, which followed the earlier death of Morelos's lieutenant, Father Mariano Matamoros, Morelos reportedly exclaimed, "I have lost both my arms, now I am nothing."

There are several places in Mexico named Galeana after the general.
