= Casa Mata Plan Revolution =

1822–23 civil war in Mexico

Date	1822 – 1823
Location	Mexico
Result	Republican victory: Fall of the First Mexican Empire; Provisional Government of Mexico is established; Agustín I is ousted and exiled

Belligerents
(Mexico) Republicans	(Mexico) First Mexican Empire

Commanders and leaders
Antonio López de Santa Anna; Vicente Guerrero (WIA); Nicolás Bravo; Guadalupe Victoria; Felipe Garza (surrendered)	Agustín I Pedro Celestino Negrete; José Gabriel de Armijo; Anastasio Bustamante; Manuel Gómez Pedraza

Strength
Republican Army	Imperial Army

Casualties and losses
Unknown	Unknown

The Casa Mata Plan Revolution was a pivotal armed conflict arising from the political power struggle between Republican and pro-Imperialist factions in the First Mexican Empire during the first half of the 19th century. This insurrection, initiated in 1823 under the leadership of General Antonio López de Santa Anna and other dissident military leaders, sought to abolish Emperor Agustín de Iturbide's regime and restore federalist republican governance. The rebellion derived its name from the Plan of Casa Mata, a manifesto that rejected Iturbide's centralized authority and called for the reinstatement of Congress. The movement ultimately led to the collapse of the First Mexican Empire and the establishment of the United Mexican States in 1824.

== Background ==
In early 1822, the last Spanish stronghold in Mexico was the Fort of San Juan de Ulúa, located on an island off the coast of Veracruz. During this period, the fort underwent a change in command. General Antonio Lopéz de Santa Anna, stationed in Veracruz, devised a plan to capture the fort by feigning Veracruz's surrender to its new Spanish commander. Captain General José Antonio Echávarri, the imperial-appointed leader of the region, arrived in Veracruz and endorsed Santa Anna's strategy, agreeing to collaborate. Echávarri positioned his troops in Veracruz to ambush the incoming Spanish forces, relying on Santa Anna's pledged support.

On October 26, 1822, Spanish troops landed, but Santa Anna's forces failed to reinforce Echávarri as planned. The imperial troops narrowly repelled the Spanish assault, allowing Spain to retain control of the fort. Echávarri later voiced suspicions to Emperor Agustín I that Santa Anna had deliberately sabotaged the operation, possibly seeking revenge for being overlooked for the Captain General position. In response, Iturbide traveled to Veracruz under the pretext of reassigning Santa Anna to a post in Mexico City, intending to remove him from command.

Anticipating his political downfall, Santa Anna refused the transfer. Instead, he rallied his troops and launched a rebellion in December 1822, openly advocating for the abolition of the monarchy and the establishment of a republic. This marked the beginning of his pivotal role in destabilizing Iturbide's regime.

== Santa Anna Uprising ==
=== Imperial response ===
Upon learning of Antonio López de Santa Anna's revolt, Emperor Agustín I (Agustín de Iturbide) declared him a traitor, stripped him of his military rank, and issued a pardon to any defectors who pledged renewed allegiance to the empire within a designated timeframe. Imperial forces were mobilized to suppress the rebellion.

=== Rebel resurgence ===
Santa Anna countered by publishing a political manifesto denouncing Iturbide's autocratic rule. His movement gained legitimacy when Guadalupe Victoria, a prominent independence war leader, joined the insurgency. The rebels rebranded their forces as the "Liberating Army" (Ejército Libertador), which gained momentum across the region.

=== Setback at Jalapa ===
Santa Anna suffered a decisive defeat on December 21, 1822, during an ill-fated assault on Jalapa. Demoralized, he reportedly contemplated exile to the United States. Guadalupe Victoria intervened, urging him to fortify Veracruz instead. According to accounts, Victoria declared: "You may set sail only when they show you my head," emphasizing resilience.

=== Strategic shift ===
Heeding Victoria's counsel, Santa Anna regrouped his forces in Veracruz, leveraging the port city's strategic and symbolic value. This pivot marked a turning point in consolidating anti-monarchist resistance.

== Resistance of Santa Anna and Battle of Almolonga ==
On January 5, 1823, independence leaders Vicente Guerrero and Nicolás Bravo defected from the imperialist army and marched to Chilapa to join the republican insurrection. Their forces, however, suffered a catastrophic defeat at the Battle of Almolonga, weakening the rebellion. By this stage, the imperial government had largely contained the uprising: Guadalupe Victoria remained blockaded at Puente del Rey, and Antonio López de Santa Anna was still confined to Veracruz.

Amid the stalemate, imperial opposition factions began negotiating with dissident military leaders. Captain General José Antonio Echevarri, initially dispatched to quash the Veracruz rebellion, ultimately defected to the rebels. On February 1, 1823, a coalition of military chiefs convened to proclaim the Plan of Casa Mata, a manifesto demanding the restoration of Congress while pledging loyalty to Emperor Agustín I and the preservation of the monarchy.

The plan gained rapid momentum. Puebla endorsed it on February 14, followed by San Luis Potosí and Guadalajara. By March 1823, most provinces had sworn allegiance to the Plan of Casa Mata, isolating Iturbide's regime and precipitating its collapse.

== Comanche Alliance ==
On the following day, the 4th Cavalry Regiment defected to the rebels. Later that night, the remaining mounted grenadiers from the Emperor's personal guard also deserted, leaving Agustín de Iturbide with only a diminished loyalist force stationed in Ixtapaluca. His position aimed to sever communication between rebel-held Puebla and other dissident factions, thereby halting further defections.

In a desperate bid to reinforce his waning authority, Iturbide reached out to Chief Guonique, a Comanche leader who had recently traveled to Mexico City to finalize peace treaties with the imperial government. Chief Guonique pledged to mobilize up to 20,000 Comanche warriors to crush the rebellion.

By this stage, however, the imperial government had already conceded significant political ground to the rebels through the Plan of Casa Mata. Even with Comanche reinforcements, victory remained unlikely due to the widespread defection of military units and provinces. The proposal ultimately failed to alter the empire's trajectory toward collapse.

== Restitution of Congress and talks with the insurgents ==
Facing mounting pressure, Emperor Agustín I (Agustín de Iturbide) reluctantly reinstated the dissolved Congress. In a public address, he ordered the allocation of resources to rebel-held territories, specified designated garrisons for insurgent forces, and proclaimed a general amnesty to "forget the grievances of the past." Confident these concessions would restore stability, Iturbide withdrew from Ixtapaluca with his remaining loyalist troops and relocated to his residence in Tacubaya.

However, public demonstrations in Mexico City had escalated to such intensity that the emperor faced confinement within his quarters. Meanwhile, the Revolutionary Board of Puebla, representing the Liberating Army (Ejército Libertador), refused to recognize the restored Congress unless it relocated beyond the emperor's political influence. This demand underscored the rebels' distrust of Iturbide's authority and their insistence on complete autonomy.

== Fall of the Empire ==
Faced with the insurgents' advance toward the capital, Emperor Agustín I (Agustín de Iturbide) abdicated on March 19, 1823. To avert a direct confrontation between the Liberating Army (Ejército Libertador) and imperial troops, Iturbide dispatched Brigadier Manuel Gómez Pedraza, the capital's military commander, to negotiate with rebel leaders at Santa Marta—the headquarters of General Antonio de Vivanco, a key insurgent commander.

On March 26, 1823, Vivanco, Nicolás Bravo, José Antonio Echávarri, Miguel Barragán, and other rebel leaders negotiated and signed a three-article agreement:

1. Recognition of whatever status Congress would grant Iturbide.
2. Guarantee of safe passage for Iturbide and his family from Tulancingo, escorted by General Bravo within three days.
3. Integration of remaining loyalist troops into the Liberating Army.

With the agreement ratified, Iturbide departed under military escort, and rebel forces entered Mexico City unopposed. This marked the definitive collapse of the First Mexican Empire and the transition to republican governance under the Provisional Government of Mexico.
