= Provisional Government of Mexico =

1823–1824 government in Mexico

Supreme Executive Power of the Mexican Nation Supremo Poder Ejecutivo de la Nación Mexicana (Spanish)
- 1823–1824
- Flag Coat of arms

- Provisional territorial organization of Mexico
- Status: Provisional government
- Capital: Mexico City
- Common languages: Spanish
- Religion: Catholic Church (official religion)
- Head of state
  - 1823–1824: Nicolás Bravo
  - 1823–1824: Guadalupe Victoria
  - 1823–1824: Pedro Celestino Negrete
  - 1824: José Mariano Michelena
  - 1824: Miguel Domínguez
  - 1824: Vicente Guerrero
- History
  - Overthrow of the monarchy: March 31, 1823
  - Disestablished: October 10, 1824
- Currency: Real
Preceded by	Succeeded by
First Mexican Empire	First Mexican Republic
- Today part of: Mexico; United States

The Supreme Executive Power (Spanish: Supremo Poder Ejecutivo) was the provisional government of Mexico that governed between the fall of the First Mexican Empire in March 1823 and the election of the first Mexican president, Guadalupe Victoria, in October 1824. After Emperor Agustín abdicated, the sovereignty of the nation passed over to Congress, which appointed a triumvirate, made up of Guadalupe Victoria, Pedro Celestino Negrete, and Nicolás Bravo, to serve as the executive, while a new constitution was being written.

During this period the government oversaw the transition of the nation from monarchy to a republic, abolishing all titles of nobility, changing the national symbols, and removing from power the remnants of the imperial government. Iturbide himself and his family were exiled to Europe, and when he attempted to return in July 1824, he was captured and executed.

A major challenge proved to be the multiple military revolts that flared up in the provinces, and in one case in the capital itself. The causes varied, ranging from agitation in favor of establishing a federation, anti-Spanish sentiment, and even efforts aiming at restoring the empire.

Elections for a new congress were held in October 1824, and the new legislature proceeded in the task of writing a new constitution, debates over the matter mainly being concerned with whether the new republic should take the form of a federation, or a centralized republic. The former faction triumphed, and the result was the 1824 Constitution of Mexico, and the Supreme Executive Power was replaced by the First Mexican Republic.

== Background ==
Independent Mexico was originally a monarchy: "constitutional and moderate" according to the Treaty of Córdoba. The new country adopted the name of the Mexican Empire.

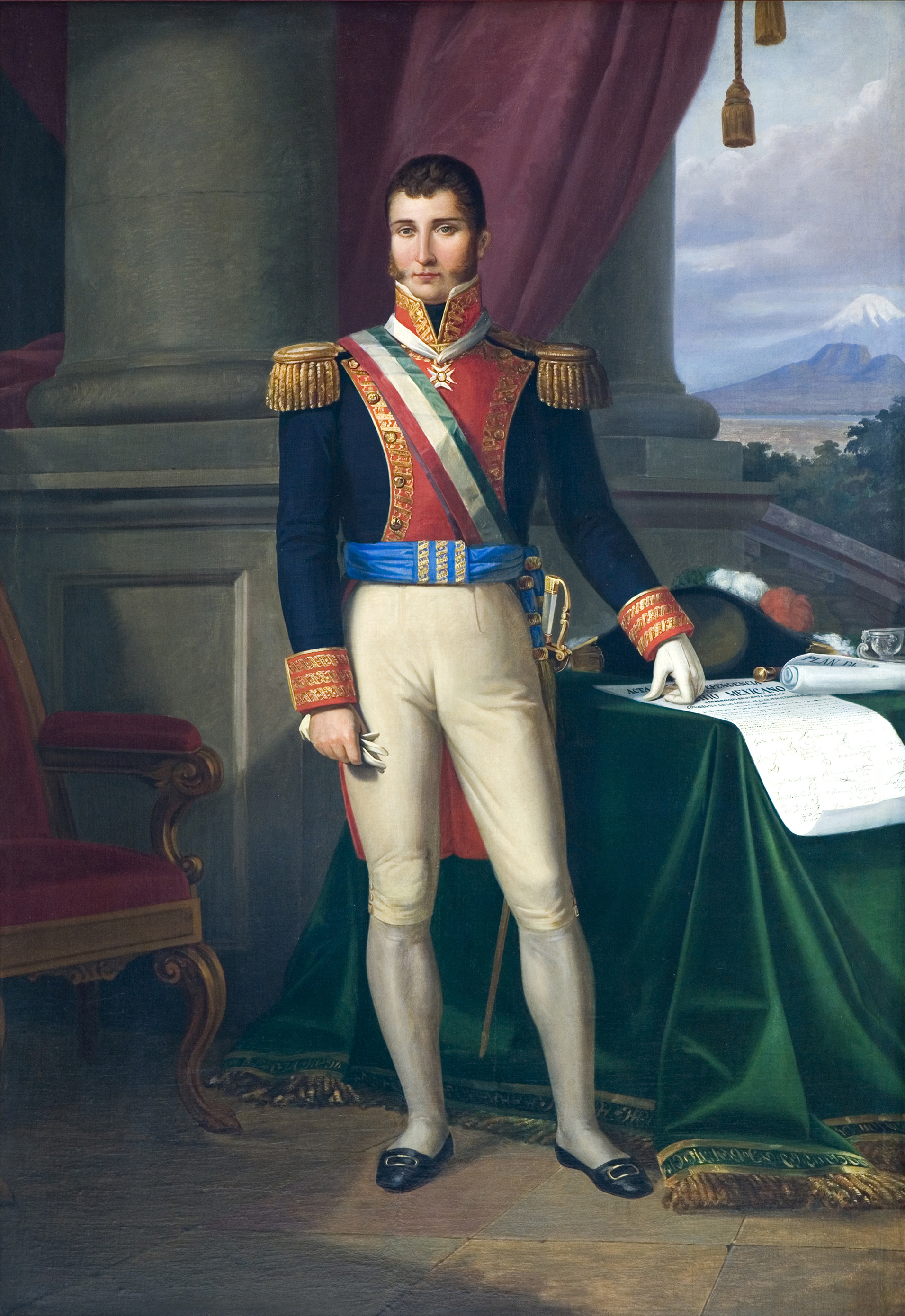
Agustin I of Mexico

The Plan of Iguala had provided for a Bourbon monarch to be placed on the Mexican throne, but when the offer was refused, a barracks revolt in the capital declared Agustín de Iturbide as emperor; congress, in search of stability and surrounded by Iturbide's military partisans, acquiesced. Iturbide was officially proclaimed Emperor of Mexico on May 18, 1822. However, the Constitutional Empire soon found itself being torn by conflicts between the emperor and Congress. Deputies were imprisoned simply for expressing their disagreements with Iturbide and finally, Iturbide decided to abolish the Congress, establishing instead a National Junta subservient to him.

The lack of a congress, the arbitrary nature of the emperor and the absence of solutions to the serious problems that the country was facing increased conspiracies to change the imperial system. Antonio López de Santa Anna proclaimed the Plan of Casa Mata, and was later joined by Vicente Guerrero and Nicolás Bravo. Iturbide then was forced to reestablish the Congress and in a vain attempt to save the order and keep the situation favorable to his supporters, he abdicated the crown of the empire on March 19, 1823.

== The transition from a monarchy to a republic ==
The First Constituent Congress declared itself installed on 29 March in Mexico City, being supported by the provincial deputations—each composed of a political chief and an intendant—on the condition that a new Congress be convened following the precepts of the Plan of Casa Mata. On 31 March, the Congress issued three decrees: the first abolished the imperial Executive Power, which had been in operation since 19 May 1822 through the Regency; the second established that a collegiate body called the Supreme Executive Power would be appointed, composed of three members who would alternate its presidency; and the third announced the names of the members chosen within Congress: Nicolás Bravo, Guadalupe Victoria, and Pedro Celestino Negrete. As the first two were not present in the capital at the time, the following day José Mariano Michelena and José Miguel Domínguez were appointed as substitutes while the members of the triumvirate were unavailable. José Ignacio García Illueca was appointed as sole minister in charge of all the secretariats of state.

After the Emperor restored Congress on April 7, it concentrated on dealing with the abdication of Iturbide. The abdication was not officially recognized, as Iturbide's election was declared to have been forced upon congress by threat of violence, and hence the throne was not legally his in the first place. The debates in congress over this matter became very heated. When a deputy attempted to declare that his vote for the emperor, representing the wishes of his district, had been free and uncompelled, the chamber rose in hostile uproar. Iturbide's coronation, titles of nobility, and hereditary succession were declared null and void. The Supreme Executive Power was asked to expedite the departure from the country of the former Emperor, who was granted an annual pension of 25,000 pesos on the condition that he would leave the country. Despite the controversy, the Plan of Iguala and the Treaty of Córdoba which had established the empire, were declared null and void.

On May 11, escorted by Nicolás Bravo, and supervised in his embarkation by Guadalupe Victoria at La Antigua, Iturbide and his family left the country on the British merchant frigate Rowllins, with Livorno as his destination. Upon Bravo's return to the capital, the Executive named new ministers: Lucas Alamán to Interior and Exterior Relations, Francisco de Arrillaga to the Treasury, Pablo de La Llave to Justice and Ecclesiastical Affairs, and José Ignacio García Illueca to War and Marine.

Political prisoners were liberated, Iturbide's council of state was abolished, and a new Supreme Court was established.

On 16 May 1823, from San Agustín de las Cuevas, Vicente Guerrero issued a manifesto to his compatriots reaffirming his opposition to the imperial regime and calling for national unity. Finally, due to the absence of Guadalupe Victoria, Guerrero was appointed substitute member of the Supreme Executive Power. On 21 May, the call was issued to form the new Congress. On 23 June, the provisional structure of the Supreme Court of Justice was established, composed of three chambers. On 19 July, Congress issued the decree declaring “good and meritorious the services rendered to the nation in the first eleven years of the war of independence and eminently meritorious in a heroic degree” to Miguel Hidalgo, Ignacio Allende, Juan Aldama, Mariano Abasolo, José María Morelos, Mariano Matamoros, Leonardo and Miguel Bravo, Hermenegildo Galeana, José Mariano Jiménez, Xavier Mina, Pedro Moreno, and Víctor Rosales. Their names were ordered to be inscribed in gold letters in the Congress hall, and commemorative monuments were to be erected at the places where they were executed. Their remains were exhumed so that on 16 September 1823 they could be transferred from distant locations to the Mexico City Cathedral. On 29 August, Guadalupe Victoria and Vicente Guerrero were likewise declared meritorious of the nation. On 11 September, Benedicto López was declared meritorious, and a pension was granted to his widow. On 3 October 1823, the Treaty of Union, League, and Perpetual Confederation between Colombia and Mexico was signed.

On July 19, 1823, Congress honored 11 deceased heroes who had fought for Mexican independence: Miguel Hidalgo, Ignacio Allende, Juan Aldama, Mariano Abasolo, José María Morelos, Mariano Matamoros, Miguel Bravo, Leonardo Bravo, Galeana, Jiménez, Mina, Pedro Moreno, and Rosales. Their names were ordered to be inscribed in gold over the congressional chamber, and monuments were ordered to be raised in their places of death. The remains which could be found were exhumed in order to hold a state funeral for them. In the aftermath of the ceremonies, a mob plotted to visit the tomb of Hernán Cortés in order to desecrate his bones, and the government had to send for the remains to be hidden and protected.

The political opposition to Iturbide at this time also led to a change in the commemoration of Mexican Independence. The War of Mexican Independence went through multiple phases, not at all under the same leadership or with the same aims, and in 1821, it was Iturbide who had finally gained independence from Spain, leading to a commemoration of the matter on the anniversary of his army's entrance into Mexico City on September 27. However, with the fall of Iturbide, the commemoration of independence was moved to September 16, commemorating the Cry of Dolores that had begun the struggle for independence.

== Administrative measures ==
During the provisional government, the captaincies general established by Iturbide were replaced by military commands; political prisoners were released; the issuance of paper money ordered by the National Instituent Junta was suspended; Miguel Santa María—who had supported the Plan of Veracruz against Iturbide—was invited to return to Mexico to resume his functions as plenipotentiary minister of Gran Colombia; and the appointment of the ministers of the Supreme Court of Justice was declared null. The crown was ordered removed from the eagle on the national coat of arms. Servando Teresa de Mier proposed changing the colors of the flag to white and blue in remembrance of those used by the insurgents and on the standards of Moctezuma, but it was decided to retain green, white, and red. In general, and without yet determining the definitive form of government of the nation, everything relating to the empire was eliminated. To provide financial resources to the treasury, existing tobacco stocks were sold at low prices, the temporalities of the Jesuits and some assets of the Hospitallers, as well as those of the Inquisition, were alienated. It was necessary to resort to a loan from the English house Staples and a loan with the house Manning and Marshall, representatives of Barclay, Herring, Richardson and Company of London.

== Financial issues ==
Executive Triumvirate
Nicolás Bravo	Guadalupe Victoria	Pedro Negrete
March 31, 1823 – October 10, 1824

Substitute Members
José Michelena	Miguel Domínguez	Vicente Guerrero
April 1, 1823 – October 10, 1824		July 2, 1823 – October 10, 1824

The insolvency of the government was one of the most pressing issues at hand. The state was nearly bankrupt and the provisional government chose to accept the debt inherited from the Spanish Viceroyalty. On April 11, 1823, the government decreed an end to the printing of paper money. On June 27, 1823, a poll tax was established. Anticipating the unpopularity of the measure, two days later the executive published a public appeal, explaining that the government was facing a grave financial crisis, and that the poll tax was established as a matter of necessity. The government sought to reform the treasury, reducing the bureaucracy involved in the collection of taxes, and setting up a system of auditors.

Loans were needed, and the government sent agents to England, which already had a reputation for sponsoring Latin American nations during the wars of independence. It was also assumed that granting loans to Mexico would give England a vested interest in the political success and independence of the Mexican nation. On May 1, 1823, Congress approved the borrowing of £3,200,000 from Goldschmidt & Co.

Three English commissioners by the name of Harvey, Ward and O'Gorman arrived in January 1824 in order to produce a report from the British government on the state of affairs in Mexico. The latter would stay as the first British consul to Mexico City.

== Loss of Central America and revolts against the government ==
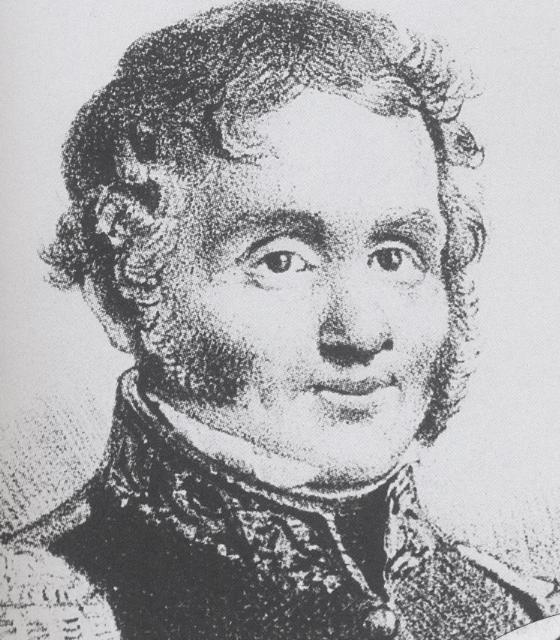
Vicente Filisola

Central America, known at this time as the Captaincy General of Guatemala had at first chosen to unite itself to the empire, and yet many were discontented with matters such as the difficulties in transport and communication with the capital, and the tariff and excise taxes that the Mexican authorities imposed upon the provinces. Brigadier Vicente Filísola was sent to Central America by Iturbide to garrison the region, and yet after the fall of the empire Filísola convened a Central American Congress on June 24, which on July 1 declared independence, founding the Federal Republic of Central America with only the province of Chiapas choosing to remain united to Mexico.

The nascent Mexican Republic was also disturbed by several political uprisings against the national government. In April, news reached the capital that the governor of Texas had declared a rebellion in favor of restoring the empire. On May 12, the provincial deputation in Guadalajara passed a resolution nullify laws passed by the capital until a new congress was convened to establish a federation. In San Luis Potosí Santa Ana, who had already led the movement to overthrow the empire, rose up and declared himself protector of the federal system. Santa Ana was captured and sent to the capital to answer for his conduct, however he was pardoned after his efforts were vindicated with the triumph of the federal system and subsequently sent to command the military in Yucatán. Congress, in order to accommodate the provinces, expanded the powers of the Provisional Deputations, giving them the power to appoint almost all government offices within their territories, and expressed support for the establishment of a federal system.

To pacify Guadalajara, 2,000 men were sent under the command of Negrete and Bravo. Meanwhile, the third member of the executive, Victoria, was in Veracruz to prevent the influence of Santa Ana, in the wake of his rebellion in San Luis Potosí from creating another disturbance. This left the executive in the charge of the two substitutes, and so to fill in the missing member of the triumvirate, on July 2, 1823, congress raised up Vicente Guerrero as a third substitute executive. The expedition to Guadalajara was successful in detaching the province of Colima from the renegade authorities in Guadalajara.

A revolt in Querétaro resulted in the execution of the ringleaders. Puebla tried to establish a legislature without the approval of Congress under the pretext that it needed to pass a protective tariff against foreign textiles to protect its own factories. The executive sent Guerrero to deal with the matter in Puebla and he also succeeded in putting down a rebellion in Cautla that was clamoring for the expulsion of the Spaniards.

A more serious revolt occurred in January 1824 in the capital itself, being led by general José María Lobato. When the government learned of the matter Congress immediately refused to hear any of the rebel's demands lest they lay down their arms, and ordered all loyal troops to come to the defense of the legitimate government. The revolt subsequently melted away.

In Guadalajara, the situation became so serious that on June 11, 1824, the executive had to send a second military expedition to pacify another revolt, this time containing substantial Iturbidist sentiment. The cause for Iturbide's restoration however, effectively ended in July 1824 when the ex-emperor himself, returned from his exile, and landed in Tampico, upon which he was subsequently tried by local authorities and executed in accordance with a bill of attainder that had been passed by congress on September 27, 1823.

== Drafting a new constitution ==

Cabinet of the Supreme Executive Power
Office	Name	Term
Foreign and Interior Relations	José Ignacio García Illueca	April 2, 1823 – April 15, 1823
Lucas Alamán	April 16, 1823 – April 23, 1823
Pablo de la Llave	April 24, 1823 – May 14, 1824
Lucas Alamán	May 15, 1824 – September 21, 1824
Juan Guzman	September 22, 1824 – October 10, 1824
Justice and Ecclesiastical Affairs	José Ignacio García Illueca	April 2, 1823 – June 6, 1823
Pablo de la Llave	June 6, 1823 – January 25, 1824
Geronimo Torrescano	January 26, 1824 – April 20, 1824
Pablo de la Llave	April 21, 1824 – October 10, 1824
Treasury	José Ignacio García Illueca	April 1, 1823 – April 30, 1823
Francisco de Arrillaga	May 2, 1823 – August 8, 1824
José Ignacio Esteva	August 9, 1824 – October 10, 1824
War and Marine	José Ignacio García Illueca	April 2, 1823 – July 11, 1823
José Joaquín de Herrera	July 12, 1823 – March 11, 1824
Manuel Mier y Teran	March 12, 1824 – October 10, 1824

On the May 21, 1823, elections were announced for a new congress whose term was scheduled to begin on October 31. Rules for the new election were published on June 17. Congressional seats were allocated on a basis of one representative per 50,000 inhabitants, elected by manhood suffrage available to any man over the age of 18, and using the three-tiered system established by the Constitution of 1812, by which voters in each parish chose electors, who then met at the district level and chose electors for the province level, whom in turn finally voted for representatives to be sent to Congress.

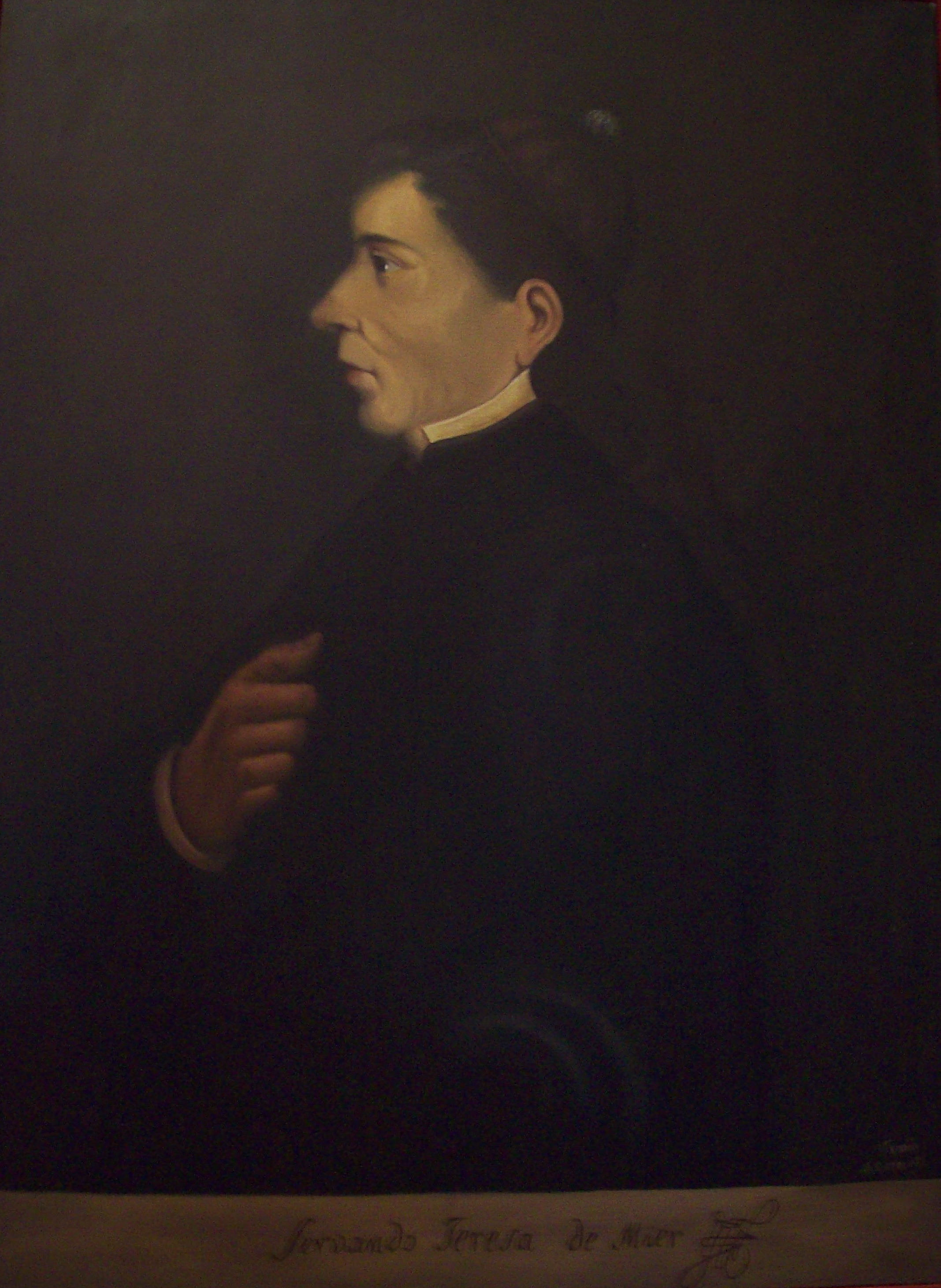
Servando Teresa de Mier

The new congress elected in late October was mainly federalist in composition. It first met on November 7, 1823, and soon divided itself into two main factions: the federalists, whose most prominent voice was Miguel Ramos Arizpe, and the centralists, whose most prominent voice was Servando Teresa de Mier. Through the minister of justice, the executive announced to the congress on November 14, that they must now set to work on answering the popular call to establish the government most suited for the nation. A constitutional committee headed by Arizpe, was commissioned with writing a constitutional draft, and on November 22, 1823, delivered the Constitutive Act (Spanish: Acta Constitutativa), with the fifth article declaring that Mexico adopts the republican, federal, popular, representative form of government, and debate on the matter began on December 3.

Deputy Mier, argued that the act was proposing a constitution copied from the United States and unsuited to the political situation in Mexico. He reasoned that the American states were separate sovereign provinces that had federated to become stronger together, while the provinces in Mexico had never been independent political entities, and that federating them would split the nation apart, resulting in the exact opposite outcome that the Americans had sought through federation. Notwithstanding the opposition, the Acta Constitutativa was adopted on January 31, 1824, as a provisional constitution.

Work on a full constitution began on April 1, 1824. A significant problem once a federation was agreed upon, was to now divide the nation into provinces that would not leave any province too powerful or too weak, a problem that was made worse by a lack of reliable statistical data. The president was to serve for four years, and the candidate who came in second was to assume the office of vice-president, a device that was copied from the United States.

Congress called for presidential elections in August 1824. Each state legislature would appoint two candidates, and the two who received the most votes from state legislatures would be elected as president and vice president. The results were announced on October 1, and by majority of 17 states, Guadalupe Victoria was elected president of the Republic. Nicolas Bravo and Vicente Guerrero had tied for second place, and Congress chose in favor of Bravo, making him vice-president.

On October 10, 1824, Guadalupe Victoria took office as the first president of Mexico.

== Presidency of the Supreme Executive Power ==
The Congress established that the Supreme Executive Power would be presided over monthly by one of its members, following the order of their respective appointments.

== See also ==
- First Mexican Republic
