= Josefa Ortiz de Domínguez =

Mexican insurgent (1768–1829)

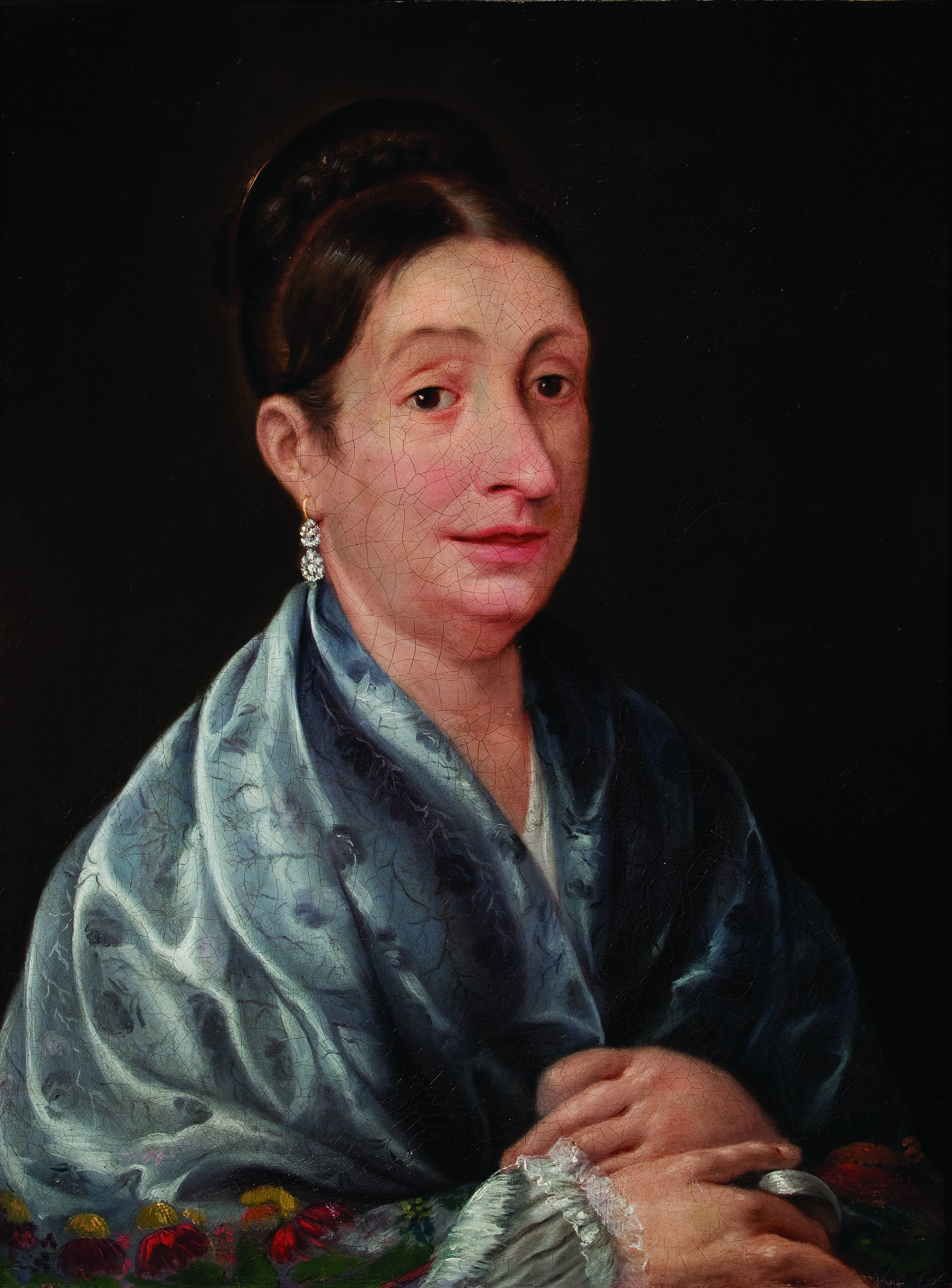
- Posthumous interpretation of Josefa Ortiz, dated 1880
- Born: María Josefa Cresencia; Ortíz y Girón; 8 September 1768; Valladolid, New Spain
- Died: 2 March 1829 (aged 60); Mexico City, Mexico
- Body discovered: Mexico City
- Other name: La Corregidora
- Spouse: Miguel Dominguez (m. 1791–1829)
- Children: 10

María Josefa Crescencia Ortiz Téllez–Girón, popularly known as Doña Josefa Ortiz de Domínguez or La Corregidora (8 September 1768 – 2 March 1829), was an insurgent and supporter of the Mexican War of Independence, which fought for independence against Spain, in the early 19th century. She was married to Miguel Domínguez, corregidor of the city of Querétaro, hence her nickname.

Ortiz de Domínguez is commemorated in the annual reenactment of the Cry of Dolores.

== Early life ==
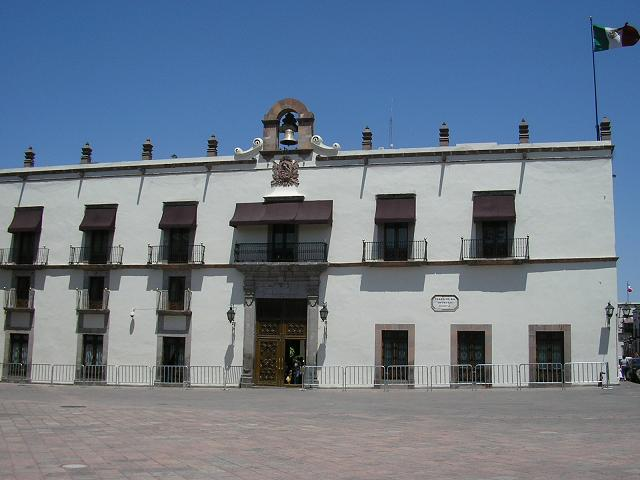
Casa de la Corregidora, the house where Josefa resided during the conspiracy.

Ortiz de Domínguez was the daughter of don Juan José Ortiz; a captain of Los Verdes regiment, and his wife doña Manuela Girón Ortiz was born in Valladolid (today Morelia, Michoacán). Her godmother was doña Ana María de Anaya. Ortiz's father was killed in a battle during her infancy and her mother died soon after. María Sotera Ortiz, Josefa's sister, took care of her upbringing and managed to secure a place for her in the prestigious Colegio de las Vizcaínas in 1789. She married Miguel Domínguez, a frequent visitor to the college, on 24 January 1791 in Mexico City.

In 1802, Miguel Domínguez was appointed by the Viceroy of New Spain to the office of "Corregidor" (a magistrate) in the city of Querétaro. During that period, Ortiz de Domínguez took care of household chores and the education of their 14 children. Ortiz de Domínguez developed an early sympathy for the Amerindian, mestizo and the criollo community who were oppressed by the Spanish colonial government. Amerindian people were oppressed; mestizos and creoles were often seen as second-class citizens and were relegated to secondary roles in the administration of the colony. This created discontent among many criollos who soon started to organize secret and literary societies where works of the Enlightenment banned by the Roman Catholic Church were discussed. Ortiz de Domínguez herself attended some of the early meetings and eventually convinced her husband to organize a number of political meetings in their house. The meetings, attended by educated figures including Miguel Hidalgo y Costilla and Ignacio Allende, quickly turned to revolutionary issues.

== War of Independence ==
The overthrow of King Ferdinand VII of Spain as a result of the Peninsular War in Spain suddenly increased the prospect of independence for the Spanish colonies in the Americas. The meetings in Ortiz de Domínguez's house became a meeting place for the revolutionary conspiracy under the guise of a literary group, and much of the insurgent planning was carried out there, including gathering weapons and supplies and storing them in various houses. The beginning of the independence uprising was planned for 8 December 1810. However, on 13 September, the conspirators were betrayed by a supporter, who informed the Spanish colonial authorities about rebel activities in Querétaro. The colonial authorities, unaware of Domínguez's wife's allegiance, asked the Corregidor to conduct a search in the town in order to apprehend the rebel leaders. He imprisoned his wife Ortiz de Domínguez in her room to prevent her from exchanging information with her fellow conspirators.

The rebels had a large following, and Ortiz de Domínguez eventually managed to get a warning out through the alcaide (warden of the royal jail of Santiago de Querétaro) Ignacio Pérez Álvarez. The traditional story is that Ortiz de Domínguez alerted Pérez, who lived on the floor below her, by striking the floor repeatedly with her shoe. However, historians have reported that the alert was actually given by striking a wall separating their residences. The news allowed the leaders of the conspiracy to abandon the town and prompted Miguel Hidalgo y Costilla to declare war against the Spanish colonial authorities earlier than expected. He gave a speech to his followers known as Grito de Dolores ("Cry of Dolores"), in the early morning of 16 September 1810, an event that signaled the start of the Mexican War of Independence.

Eventually, the role of Ortiz de Domínguez and her husband played in the conspiracy was uncovered. They were imprisoned separately. She was sent to the monastery of Santa Clara, in Querétaro, and then to Mexico City to stand trial. Despite her husband's efforts as her lawyer, she was found guilty and placed in reclusion in the monastery of Santa Teresa. Due to her rebellious character, she was soon transferred to the convent of Santa Catalina de Sena. Ortiz de Domínguez was released in 1817, under an oath that she would refrain from supporting the rebellion.

== Post-Independence ==
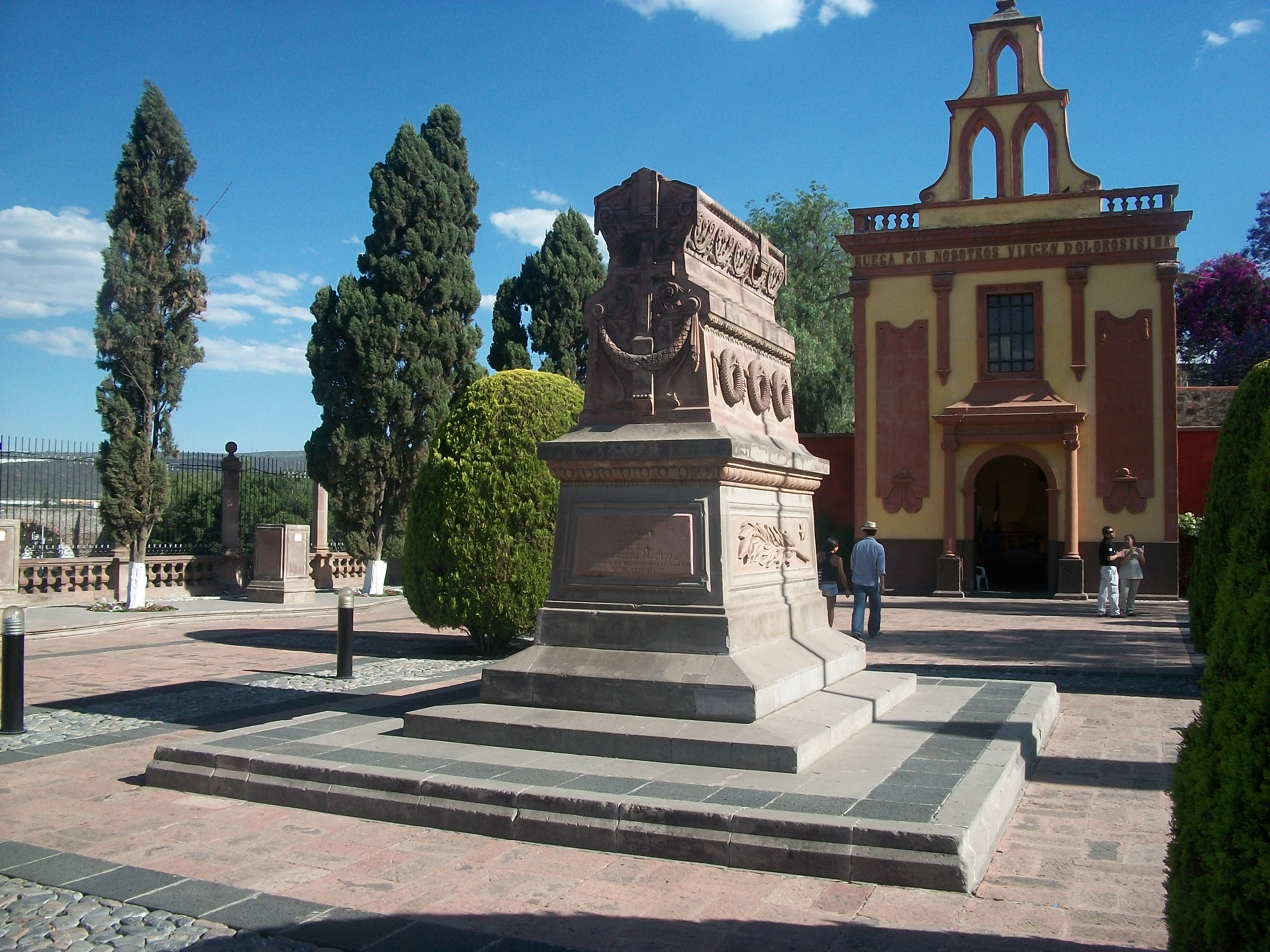
Graves of Josefa and her husband, the corregidores

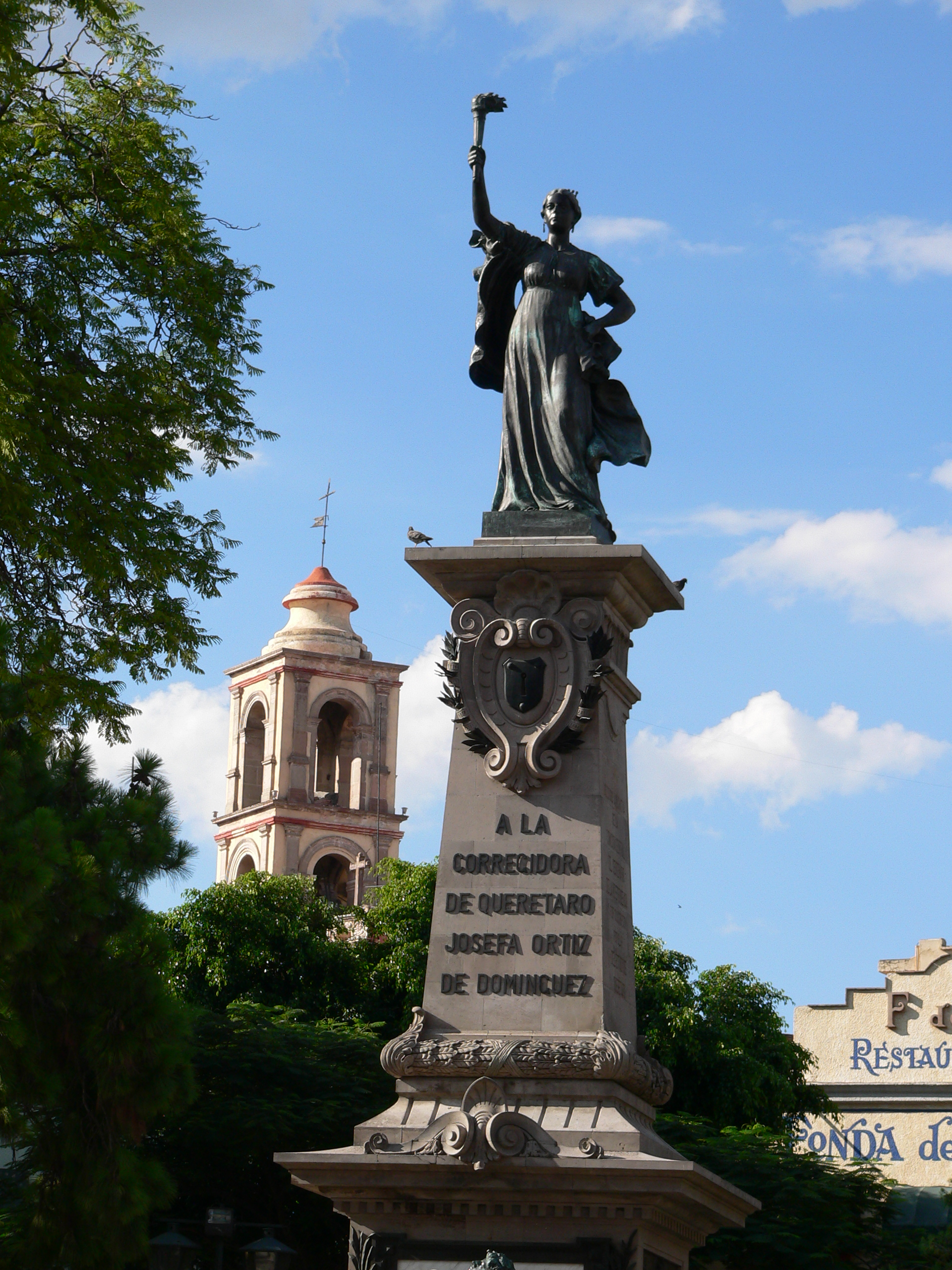
Statue of the Corregidora Josefa Ortiz de Dominguez in Santiago de Querétaro

After the war of independence in 1822, Mexican Emperor Agustín de Iturbide offered Ortiz de Domínguez the role of lady-in-waiting for his wife, Ana María de Huarte y Muñiz. However, Ortiz de Domínguez believed the establishment of a Mexican Empire, instead of a Republic, was against the ideals she had fought for during the revolutionary period, and she refused the honor. In 1823, she was designated a "woman of honor" by the empress, a tribute which she also denounced.

During the late years of her life, Ortiz de Domínguez was involved with several radical political groups. She always refused any reward from her involvement in the independence movement arguing that she was only doing her duty as a patriot.

Ortiz de Domínguez died in 1829, in Mexico City. She was originally buried in the convent of Santa Catalina de Sena, but later her remains were moved to Querétaro. The government of Querétaro declared her "Benemérita del Estado".

In 1910, Ortiz de Domínguez and Leona Vicario were the first women to be depicted on Mexican stamps and the second women to be depicted on stamps in Latin America. Her profile also appeared on the five-centavo coin from 1942 to 1976, and on a version of the five-peso coin issued in 2010 as part of a series to commemorate the bicentenary of the country's independence.

== La Corregidora ==
In 1791 Josefa Ortiz married Miguel Domínguez, who around those years was working for the Secretary of the Revenue Service and in the office of Virreinato de la Nueva España. Because of his connections he was named Corregidor of Querétaro in 1802.
