= Guadalupe Victoria =

President of Mexico from 1824 to 1829

The Most Excellent Guadalupe Victoria General de Division del Ejercito Mexicano
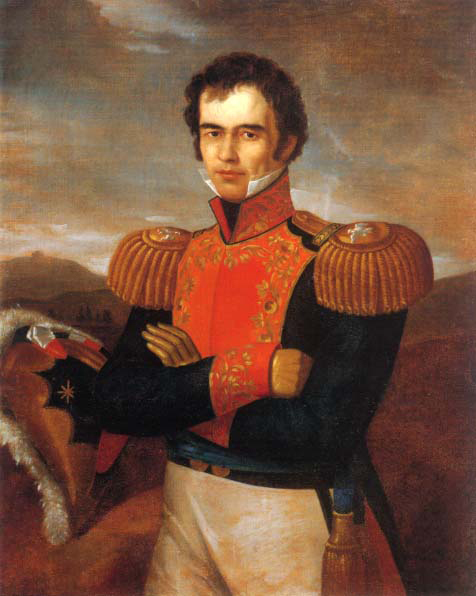
- Portrait of Guadalupe Victoria by Carlos Paris

1st President of Mexico
- In office 10 October 1824 – 31 March 1829
- Vice President: Nicolás Bravo (1824–1827), vacant (1827–1829) (Note: Nicolás Bravo revolted against Victoria in 1827, but was captured. He was removed from the vice presidency and exiled, and the position was left vacant until the election of 1829, wherein Anastasio Bustamante replaced him.)
- Preceded by: Office established, Provisional Government (as governing body of Mexico); Agustin de Iturbide (as Emperor of Mexico)
- Succeeded by: Vicente Guerrero

Member of the Supreme Executive Power
- In office 31 March 1823 – 10 October 1824
- Preceded by: Constitutional Monarchy; Agustín I
- Succeeded by: Federal Republic; Himself as president

Governor of Puebla
- In office 31 March 1834 – 13 December 1836
- Preceded by: Patricio Furlong
- Succeeded by: José Mariano Marín

Governor of Veracruz
- In office 1 January 1824 – 20 May 1824
- Preceded by: Office established
- Succeeded by: Miguel Barragán

Personal details
- Born: José Miguel Ramón Adaucto Fernández y Félix; 29 September 1786 Tamazula, Nueva Vizcaya, Viceroyalty of New Spain (present-day Durango, Mexico)
- Died: 21 March 1843 (aged 56) San Carlos Fortress, Perote, Veracruz, Mexican Republic
- Resting place: Column of Independence, Mexico City
- Party: Independent
- Spouse: María Antonia Bretón (m. 1841)
- Relatives: Francisco Victoria (brother)
- Education: San Ildefonso College
- Occupation: Lawyer; military officer; politician

Military service
- Allegiance: Mexican Insurgency; Army of the Three Guarantees; Mexico
- Branch/service: Mexican Army
- Years of service: 1812–1823
- Rank: General
- Battles/wars: Mexican War of Independence; Siege of Cuautla; Capture of Oaxaca; Veracruz Campaign; Casa Mata Plan Revolution; Spanish attempts to reconquer Mexico

Guadalupe Victoria (Spanish pronunciation: [ɡwaðaˈlupe βikˈtoɾja]; 29 September 1786 – 21 March 1843), born José Miguel Ramón Adaucto Fernández y Félix, was a Mexican general and politician who fought for independence against the Spanish Empire in the Mexican War of Independence and after the adoption of the Constitution of 1824, was elected as the first president of the United Mexican States. He was a deputy in the Mexican Chamber of Deputies for Durango and a member of the Supreme Executive Power following the downfall of the First Mexican Empire, which was followed by the 1824 Constitution and his presidency. He later served as Governor of Puebla.

Born in Nueva Vizcaya, New Spain (now Durango), he graduated from the College of San Ildefonso with a Bachelor of Laws degree. He joined the Mexican War of Independence under general José María Morelos. During the war, he became one of the most prominent independence generals, participating in numerous battles, including the siege of Cuautla, the capture of Oaxaca, and many battles in Veracruz. In 1817, his troops deserted him, and he stayed in hiding until 1821, when the independence movement was reinvigorated by generals Vicente Guerrero and Agustín de Iturbide, and he helped re-capture Veracruz.

Victoria remained an important and popular figure in the army during the First Mexican Empire, after the Declaration of Independence, wherein de Iturbide served as Emperor Agustín. The two were at odds due to de Iturbide's suspension of congress and his refusal to install a republican form of government. Victoria joined Antonio López de Santa Anna's revolt, and de Iturbide was exiled in 1823. Victoria then served as part of the Provisional Government from 1823 to 1824, when congress ratified the Constitution of 1824, and elected Victoria as Mexico's first president.

As president, he established diplomatic relations with the United Kingdom, the United States, the Federal Republic of Central America, and Gran Colombia. He also founded the National Museum, promoted education, and ratified the border with the United States of America. He decreed the expulsion of the Spaniards remaining in the country and defeated the last Spanish stronghold in the castle of San Juan de Ulúa.

In 1829, Victoria peacefully passed the presidency to general Vicente Guerrero. Victoria was the only president to complete his full term in more than 30 years of an independent Mexico. He later served as a senator for Durango and Veracruz, governor of Puebla, and president of the senate. He negotiated an end to the Pastry War with France in 1838. He died in 1843 at the age of 56 from epilepsy in the fortress of Perote, where he was receiving medical treatment. On 8 April of the same year, it was decreed that his name would be written in golden letters in the session hall of the Chamber of Deputies.

Victoria is considered a national hero and one of the most popular presidents in the history of early Mexico. There are numerous streets, airports, schools, and cities (most notably Victoria de Durango and Ciudad Victoria) named in his honor, as is the city of Victoria, Texas, in the United States.

== Childhood and education ==
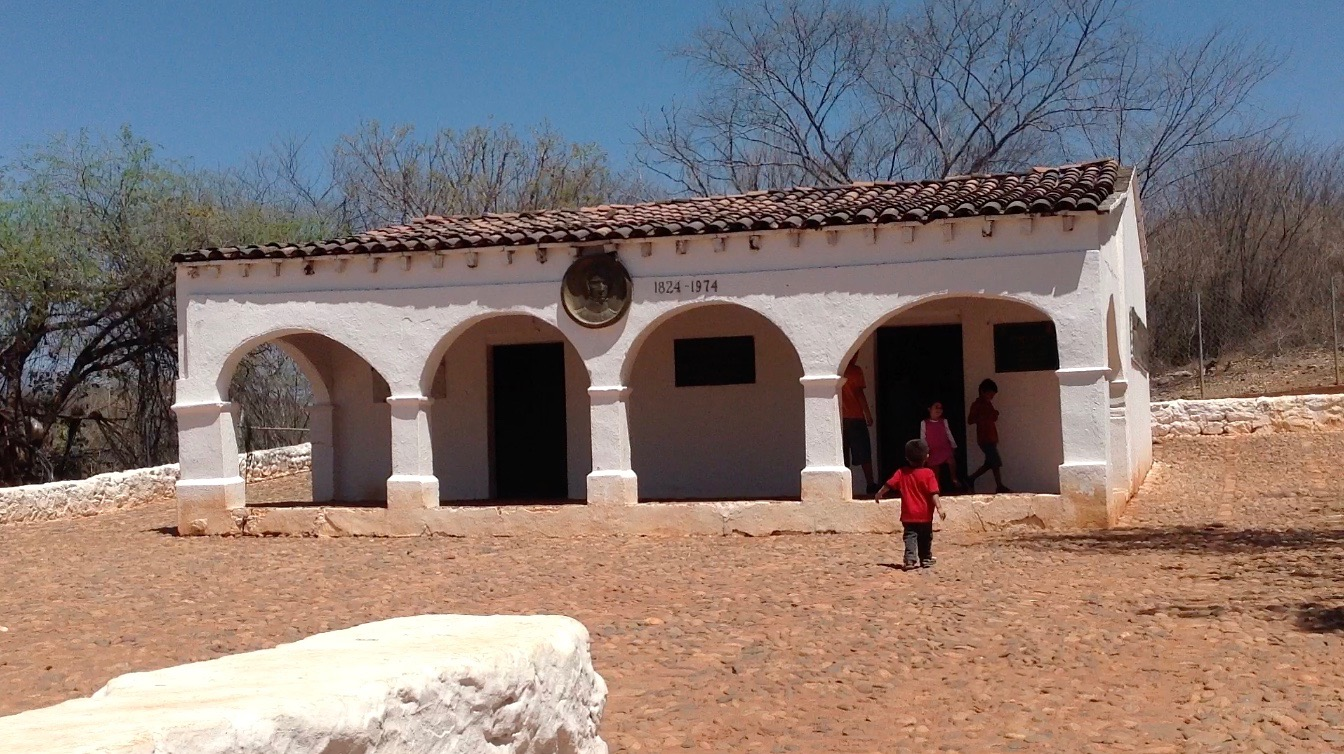
Victoria's birthplace and childhood home, now a museum, in Tamazula de Victoria, Durango

Guadalupe Victoria was born as José Miguel Ramón Adaucto Fernández y Félix on 29 September 1786 in Tamazula in the province of Nueva Vizcaya, New Spain (now the Mexican state of Durango). His parents, who died early in his childhood, were Manuel Fernández de Victoria and María Alejandra Félix Niebla. He was baptized by his paternal uncle Agustín Fernández, at that time the priest of Tamazula, with whom he lived after being orphaned.

He studied at the Seminary of Durango. Having no resources to pay for food, he made copies of a Latin grammar text to sell to other students for two reales. In 1807, he went to Mexico City, where he enrolled in the college of San Ildefonso to pursue degrees in Canon Law and Civil Law. He studied under a tense atmosphere, because the school was militarized by a colonial order. On 24 April 1811, he submitted his review and graduated as a Bachelor of Laws.

== Mexican War of Independence ==
In 1812, he joined the insurgent forces of Hermenegildo Galeana and fought alongside José María Morelos at the Siege of Cuautla. He also participated in the assault on Oaxaca and joined the troops of Nicolás Bravo in Veracruz. He dedicated himself and his troops to controlling the passage of El Puente del Rey and became famous for his successful attacks on military convoys until 1815, when he was defeated.

=== Assault of Oaxaca ===
The assault on Oaxaca took place on 25 November 1812. Insurgents led by José María Morelos defeated the royalist forces of Lieutenant General Gonzalez Saravia.

Other members of the insurgent forces that participated in the assault of Oaxaca were Hermenegildo Galeana, Nicolás Bravo, Mariano Matamoros, Manuel Mier y Terán, and Vicente Guerrero.

Guadalupe Victoria engaged in the battle in the Juego de Pelota, which was surrounded by a moat that insurgent soldiers did not dare to cross; Guadalupe Victoria threw his sword across the moat and said ¡Va mi espada en prenda, voy por ella! (There goes my sword as pledge, I'm going for it!). He swam across the moat and cut the rope of a bridge to allow the insurgent troops into the city.

The loss of Oaxaca was a heavy blow to the colonial government, because it gave great military prestige to Morelos, as well as a privileged geographical position because of the roads and towns that could be controlled from that site.

Due to his success in Oaxaca, by order of the Congress of Chilpancingo, Victoria was granted the command of the insurgent army in Veracruz. At the same time, José Miguel Fernández y Félix decided to change his name to Guadalupe due to his devotion to the Virgin of Guadalupe, and Victoria for the victory.

=== Veracruz ===
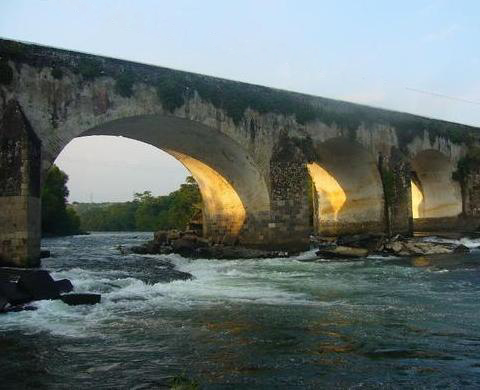
Former Puente del Rey, today, Puente Nacional in the state of Veracruz

In 1815, Victoria commanded insurgents in the region of Veracruz. Using guerrilla warfare tactics, he obtained control of the Puente del Rey ("King's Bridge"), a strategic position that connected Xalapa to the port of Veracruz. When he learned that royalist troops were coming to fight, he reinforced the defenses on the bridge, but was still forced to retreat to Nautla in July of that year.

To have a point of supply from the Gulf of Mexico, Victoria took control of the Boquilla de Piedras, a port located between Tuxpan and the port of Veracruz. This port was fitted with docks, warehouses and batteries for defense and remained under the control of Victoria until November 1816, when it was retaken by the royalist army. Shortly afterwards, Naolinco became the headquarters of the insurgents, and from there they controlled the area of Misantla, Puente Nacional and Huatusco.

Also in 1816, when the new viceroy Juan Ruiz de Apodaca arrived at New Spain, Victoria attacked his convoy to Mexico City and came very close to capturing him.

In late 1816, Victoria regained Nautla, defeating the royalist garrison. He also occupied Barra de Palmas, Barra Nueva and La Laguna. The strong royalist offensive, as well as a lack of military equipment, resulted in the occupied positions being recovered by the Spaniards in February 1817.

By mid-1817, Guadalupe Victoria had lost all the towns of his command. After his defeat in Palmillas, he was abandoned by his men and faced intense persecution. He hid in the jungle, where he survived eating herbs, fruits and animals. He refused to accept a pardon from the Viceroy for his actions and remained hidden in the jungles of Veracruz, where he developed epilepsy. His sporadic appearances in the towns turned him into a legend among the inhabitants of the region.

=== Plan of Iguala and Treaty of Córdoba ===
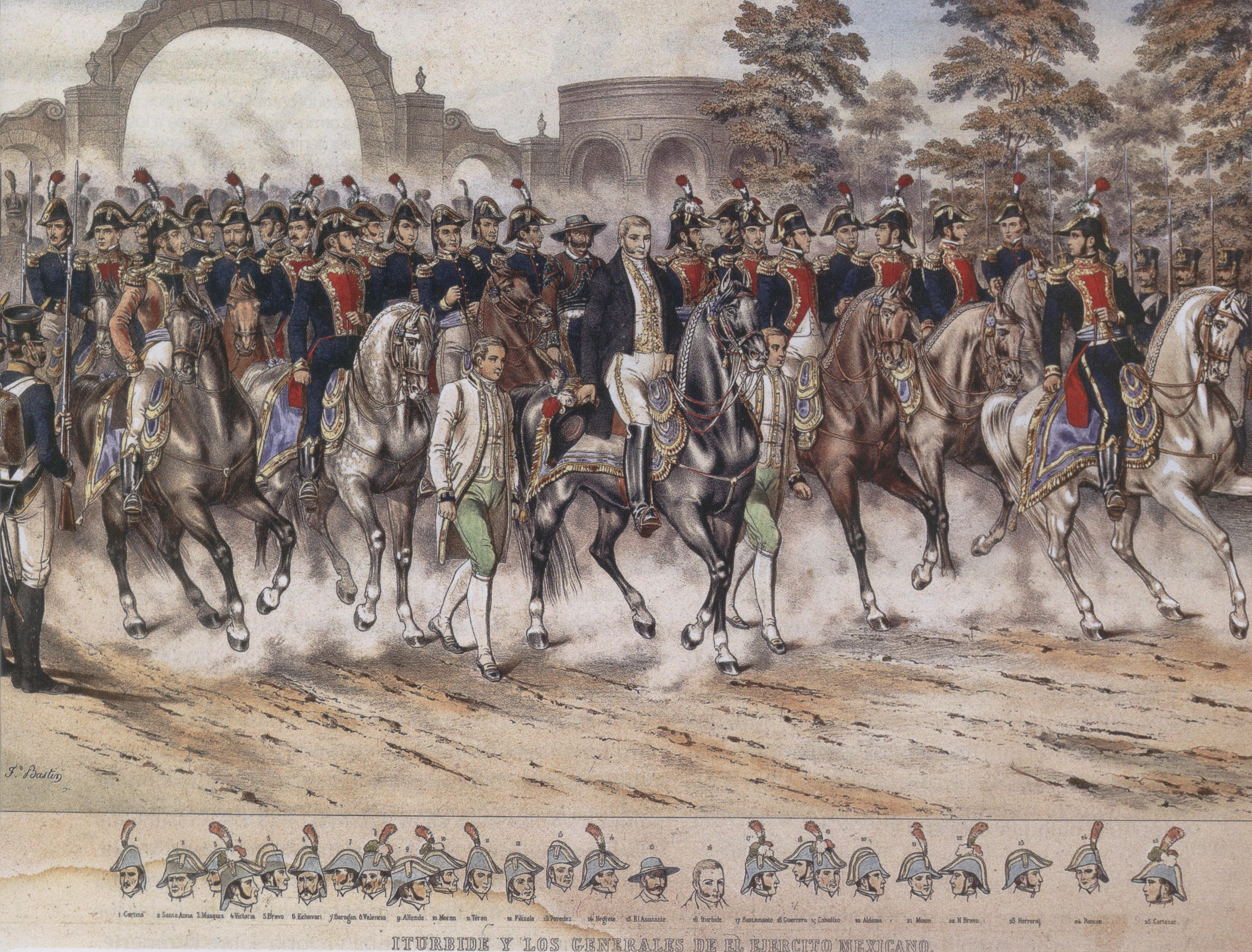
Entry of the Army of the Three Guarantees to Mexico City on 27 September 1821.

Guadalupe Victoria spent almost four years hiding in the jungle. They were difficult years for the independence movement and the colonial government thought that the movement had been suppressed. During this time most of the insurgents accepted a viceregal pardon; only Vicente Guerrero kept up the fight.

The installation of the Cortes of Cádiz in Spain and the deterioration of the Spanish monarchy on the Iberian Peninsula helped revitalize the struggle for Mexican independence at the end of 1820. Victoria was informed about the progress of the insurrection and reappeared on 30 December of that year in the town of Soledad, where a small garrison quickly joined him.

On 24 February 1821, Agustín de Iturbide and Vicente Guerrero proclaimed the Plan of Iguala. Iturbide began a tour of the Bajío region to spread the movement. Several royalist military leaders joined the Plan of Iguala and so did some retired insurgent leaders, including Nicolás Bravo and Ignacio López Rayón. Guadalupe Victoria also joined. On 6 April, Victoria proclaimed independence in the town of Soledad. In late May, with the exception of the capital, the province of Veracruz was up in arms.

The Army of the Three Guarantees was created on 24 February 1821 as part of the Plan of Iguala and continued battling Spanish royalist forces that refused to accept Mexican independence. These battles continued until 21 August 1821, when Iturbide and Spanish Viceroy Juan O'Donojú signed the Treaty of Córdoba.

On 27 September 1821, the Army of the Three Guarantees entered Mexico City, forming a column headed by Agustín de Iturbide. Among the officers who entered the city that day were Pedro Celestino Negrete, Vicente Guerrero, Nicolás Bravo, Anastasio Bustamante, Melchor Múzquiz, José Joaquín de Herrera, Manuel Mier y Terán, Luis Quintanar, Miguel Barragán, Vicente Filisola, Antonio López de Santa Anna and Guadalupe Victoria. On 28 September 1821, the Declaration of Independence of the Mexican Empire was signed.

== Mexican Empire ==
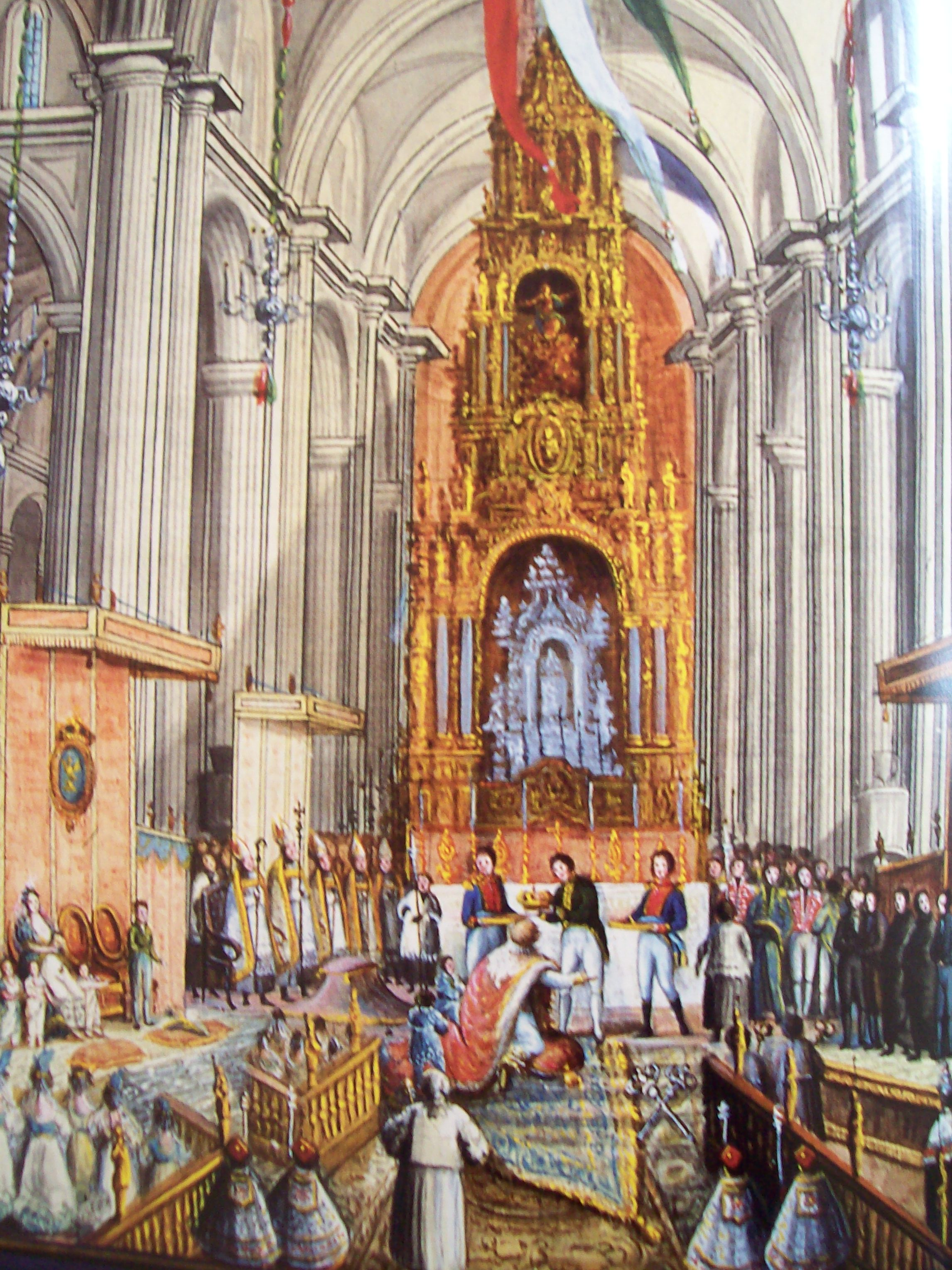
Coronation of Iturbide on 21 July 1822.

Guadalupe Victoria met with Agustín de Iturbide on 17 June 1821 in San Juan del Río and asked him to adopt the Plan of Iguala to create a republican government. Victoria recommended as ruler a former insurgent who was unmarried and had not accepted the pardon. This man would marry an indigenous Guatemalan woman to unite both territories into a single nation. Iturbide refused the proposition. Both men supported independence, but felt a mutual distrust.

A regency was created to serve as executive, led by Iturbide, who ruled until 18 May 1822, when he was proclaimed emperor. Iturbide chose all members of the Provisional Governing Board, which would serve as Legislative and rule until 24 February 1822, when the First Constituent Congress was installed. Almost all members were notable for their social position, wealth and titles. They were also all former fervent supporters of the Spanish rule. None of the former insurgents, such as Vicente Guerrero, Nicolás Bravo, Ignacio López Rayón, Guadalupe Victoria and Andrés Quintana Roo, were called to participate.

In early 1822, some of the former insurgents with republican ideas began meeting at the house of Miguel Domínguez in Querétaro. They wrote to Pedro Celestino Negrete inviting him to participate, but he thought that it was a conspiracy and told Iturbide. Seventeen people were arrested, including Guadalupe Victoria, Nicolás Bravo and Miguel Barragán. The "conspiracy" was only meetings during which they talked about the future of government. Almost immediately, participants were released, with the exception of Guadalupe Victoria, who remained jailed, but who soon after escaped from prison and hid in Veracruz.

Congress asked to review the case of Guadalupe Victoria, who had been elected deputy by Durango. Victoria was a fugitive, indicted on charges of conspiracy. He was requested to present himself to congress, but he preferred to stay hidden.

On 21 July 1822, Agustín de Iturbide was crowned Emperor of Mexico, but the workings of the Constitutional Empire soon demonstrated the incompatibility of its two main components, the Emperor and the Constituent Congress. The deputies were imprisoned after expressing their disagreement with Iturbide and finally, Iturbide decided to eliminate the Congress, establishing instead a National Board.

=== Plan of Casa Mata ===
The lack of a Congress, the arbitrary actions of the Emperor, and the absence of solutions to the serious problems that the country was facing, increased conspiracies to change the imperial system. Antonio López de Santa Anna proclaimed the Plan of Casa Mata and was later joined by Vicente Guerrero and Nicolás Bravo.

On 6 December 1822, Guadalupe Victoria came out of hiding to join the movement. Knowing his reputation and popularity, Santa Anna appointed him leader of the movement and together they proclaimed the Plan of Veracruz.

On 31 December, Santa Anna was defeated by General Calderón. Forced to retreat, on 24 December he met with a group of 300 troops of Guadalupe Victoria in Puente del Rey. Santa Anna again took advantage of the popularity of Guadalupe Victoria by encouraging people to join the cause.

When Santa Anna and Victoria were defeated, Santa Anna tried to flee to the United States and Victoria said to him:

"…You go to Veracruz to hold your position and when you see the head of Victoria, take a ship… it is an honor for you stay by my side to defend the cause of freedom."

On 22 January 1823, Santa Anna reported to Victoria: I was attacked from all directions by the imperial forces. On 1 February 1823, a radical shift occurred when the imperial Generals Echeverría, Lobato and Cortázar signed the Plan of Casa Mata.

Iturbide was forced to reinstate the Congress. In a vain attempt to keep a favorable situation for his supporters, he abdicated the crown of the Empire on 19 March 1823.

== Supreme Executive Power ==
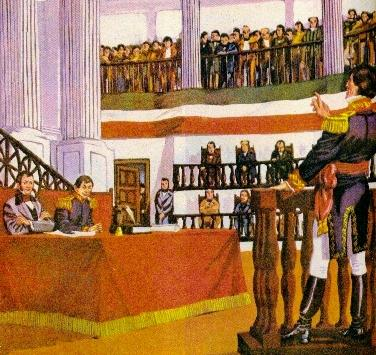
Guadalupe Victoria and Nicolás Bravo in the Second Constituent Congress.

On 26 March 1823, it was determined that Iturbide would have to leave the country with his family. He was escorted by General Nicolás Bravo as requested by the former emperor.

On 31 March 1823, Congress met and granted the Executive role to a triumvirate named the Supreme Executive Power. Its members were Pedro Celestino Negrete, Nicolás Bravo and Guadalupe Victoria, with alternates being Miguel Domínguez, Mariano Michelena and Vicente Guerrero. On 7 April 1823, Congress nullified the designation of Iturbide as Emperor (and therefore the recognition of his abdication) and made it seem as if the coronation of Iturbide was a logical mistake in the establishment of Independence. Congress abolished the Plan of Iguala and the Treaty of Córdoba, leaving the country free to choose any system of government it wished.

Despite being elected to be part of the Supreme Executive Power, Victoria remained in military control of Veracruz, where he oversaw the transportation of Iturbide to Europe and organized resistance against Spanish attacks from San Juan de Ulúa.

The Supreme Executive Power was commissioned to direct the former provinces, now Free States, to create the Federal Republic and also to call elections for a new constituent congress. The Executive had to overcome a series of political difficulties, such as the case of the Central American provinces that chose not to join Mexican Federation, and the provinces of Oaxaca, Yucatán, Jalisco and Zacatecas that declared themselves free and sovereign states. They also faced a conspiracy of supporters of Iturbide and an anti-Spanish rebellion.

On 31 January 1824, the Constitutive Act of the Federation was approved, which was an interim status of the new government. The nation formally assumed sovereignty and was made up of free, sovereign and independent states. During the following months, the constitutional debates continued.

On 4 October 1824, the Federal Constitution of United Mexican States was proclaimed.

== Presidency (1824–1829) ==

Government of Guadalupe Victoria
| Office | Name | Term |
| Foreign and Interior Relations | Juan Guzman | 10 October 1824 – 11 January 1825 |
| Lucas Alamán | 12 January 1825 – 26 September 1825 |
| Manuel Gómez Pedraza | 27 September 1825 – 2 November 1825 |
| Sebastián Camacho | 3 November 1825 – 5 July 1826 |
| Juan José Espinosa de los Monteros | 6 July 1826 – 7 March 1828 |
| Juan de Dios Cañedo | 8 March 1828 – 25 January 1829 |
| José María Bocanegra | 26 January 1829 – 1 April 1829 |
| Justice and Ecclesiastical Affairs | Pablo de la Llave | 10 October 1824 – 29 November 1825 |
| Miguel Ramos Arizpe | 30 November 1825 – 7 March 1828 |
| Juan José Espinosa de los Monteros | 8 March 1828 – 31 March 1829 |
| Treasury | José Ignacio Esteva | 10 October 1824 – 26 September 1825 |
| Pable de la Llave | 27 September 1825 – 27 November 1825 |
| Jose Ignacio Esteva | 28 November 1825 – 4 March 1827 |
| Tomas Salgado | 5 March 1827 – 1 November 1827 |
| Francisco García | 2 November 1827 – 30 November 1827 |
| José Ignacio Pavón | 1 December 1827 – 7 March 1828 |
| Jose Ignacio Esteva | 8 March 1828 – 12 Jan . 1829 |
| Bernardo Gonzalez Anugulo | 13 January 1829 – 1 April 1829 |
| War and Marine | Manuel Mier y Teran | 10 October 1824 – 18 December 1824 |
| Jose Castro | 19 December 1824 – 7 January 1825 |
| Manuel Gómez Pedraza | 8 January 1825 – 7 June 1825 |
| Jose Ignacio Esteva | 8 June 1825 – 14 July 1825 |
| Manuel Gómez Pedraza | 15 July 1825 – 9 February 1827 |
| Manuel Rincon | 10 February 1827 – 3 March 1827 |
| Manuel Gómez Pedraza | 4 March 1827 – 3 December 1828 |
| Jose Castro | 4 December 1828 – 7 December 1828 |
| Vicente Guerrero | 8 December 1828 – 25 December 1828 |
| Francisco Moctezuma | 26 December 1828 – 1 April 1829 |

The Congress called for presidential elections in August 1824. Each state legislature would appoint two candidates, and the two who received the most votes would be elected as president and vice president. The results were announced on 1 October and by majority of 17 states, Guadalupe Victoria was elected president of the republic.

On 2 October 1824, Guadalupe Victoria was declared the first president of the United Mexican States for the period 1825–1829. On 8 October, the president and vice-president Nicolás Bravo swore the constitution. Guadalupe Victoria took office as interim president from 10 October 1824 to 31 March 1825. His constitutional term in office began on 1 April 1825. The inauguration was solemn and austere as required by his republicanism. That day, Victoria affirmed ¡La Independencia se afianzará con mi sangre y la libertad se perderá con mi vida! (Independence will be reinforced with my blood and freedom will be lost with my life).

=== Domestic issues ===
As president of the new republic, Victoria was in charge of rebuilding an economy devastated by the long war of independence and the economic blockade promoted by the Spanish Crown. To resolve the lack of supplies, a result of the trade embargo, he created the country's merchant marine, which opened trade routes with the ports of the countries of the Americas that had recognized the national independence and with which diplomatic relations were established. However, his main concern was to achieve recognition from European countries.

The government of Victoria was hampered by severe financial problems. His expenses averaged $18 million spanish dollars—colloquially known as pesos—annually, but he was only collecting half that amount in revenues. In order to resolve that problem, Victoria was forced to seek foreign aid. The United Kingdom, knowing how hard-pressed Victoria was (the Army alone accounted for $12 million of the budget), persuaded him to accept two loans, each of over £3 million pounds. These loans, negotiated through banking houses such as Barclay and Goldschmidt, averted bankruptcy and helped retain social peace, factors that undoubtedly enabled Victoria to serve out his full term.

Despite these financial problems, there were some highly positive aspects to Victoria's administration. Two of the first president's most positive achievements were the establishment of the National Treasury when he held for the first time the Grito de Dolores. In addition, he established the Military Academy, restored Mexico City, improved education, accorded amnesty to political prisoners, laid plans for a canal in the Isthmus of Tehuantepec, opened new ports for shipping, began construction on the National Museum, garrisoned Yucatán to thwart a contemplated Cuba-based Spanish invasion, and unmasked a conspiracy led by a monk named Joaquín Arenas to restore Spanish rule.

Victoria also facilitated the activities of the Lancasterian Society, which was dedicated to education, and he created the naval force that enabled his greatest achievement: the complete independence of Mexico, when on 18 November 1825, general Miguel Barragán took the last Spanish stronghold, the fortress of San Juan de Ulúa in Veracruz.

In politics, his actions were conciliatory. He tried to apply policies that would attract different sides and formed his cabinet with prominent members of the different factions. However, the old conflicts since the days of Iturbide resurfaced. Victoria faced the contradiction of religious intolerance against freedom of speech and press, which were declared in the Constitution, and which he scrupulously observed.

On 20 December 1827, he decreed the expulsion of Spaniards of the Republic. The suppressed rebellion of Joaquín Arenas sparked a wave of outrage against the wealthy Spaniards who had sponsored it. Though Lucas Alamán, his Secretary of the Interior, tried to dissuade him, American ambassador Joel R. Poinsett encouraged Victoria to order the expulsion of the Spaniards, which caused serious economic problems, because most of those expelled were traders who brought their fortunes to Spain.

==== San Juan de Ulúa ====
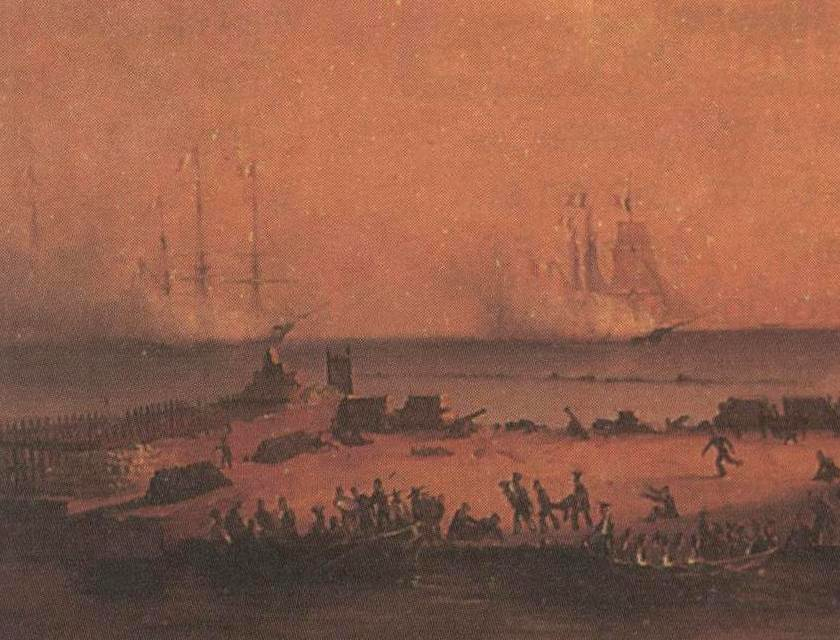
Capitulation of San Juan de Ulúa.

The War of Independence ruined fields, towns, trade and mining. The government had no effective ways of collecting additional customs taxes, and the government operated under debit and salary arrears. Under these conditions it was difficult to undertake an effective strategy for the surrender of San Juan de Ulúa.

Despite this, Victoria's government purchased some ships to form the basis of the first Mexican Navy. They included the schooners Iguala, Anáhuac, Chalco, Chapala, Texcoco, Orizaba, Campechana and Zumpango. The schooners Tampico, Papaloapan and Tlaxcalteca were added later.

Finally, on 23 November 1825, frigate Captain Pedro Sainz de Baranda achieved the capitulation of San Juan de Ulúa, the last Spanish bastion in Mexico.

==== Northern Territories ====
Map of Mexico in 1824.

Guadalupe Victoria rejected two bids over Texas offered by American ambassador Joel R. Poinsett, including one for $5 million.

On 18 August 1824, the General Colonization Law was issued to populate the Northern Territories of (Alta California, Nuevo México and the north side of the state of Coahuila y Tejas). The decree left the administration of public lands in the hands of the states. On 24 March 1825, the congress passed a law to open the doors to foreign colonization fully; the law gave the settlers land privileges and exemption from taxes for ten years.

The immigration of Americans was abundant and communities quickly formed that retained their language, religion and customs, resulting in weak links with the rest of the country. They disobeyed the laws and continued slavery in Mexican territory. In 1826, the first attempt at separatism was made when empresario Haden Edwards declared independence from state of Coahuila y Tejas and created the Republic of Fredonia near Nacogdoches, Texas. The rebellion was quickly quelled.

As a direct result of Edwards's actions, Victoria authorized an extensive expedition, conducted by General Manuel de Mier y Terán, to inspect the Texas settlements and recommend a future course of action. Mier y Terán's reports led to the Laws of 6 April 1830, which severely restricted immigration into Texas.

==== Nicolás Bravo's rebellion ====
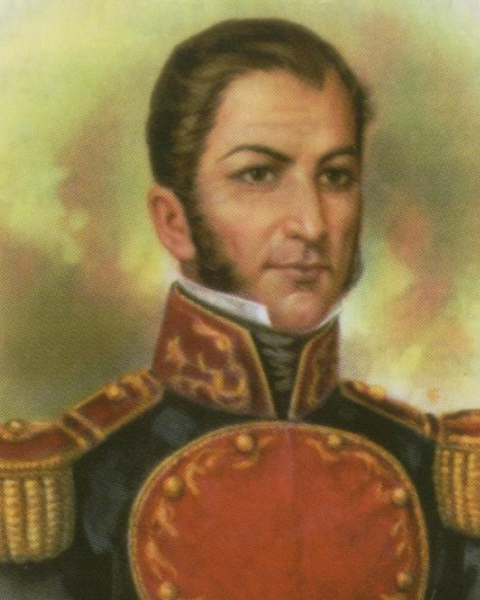
Oil of Nicolás Bravo

During his term, Guadalupe Victoria faced several attempted coups d'état against his government. Seven months after starting his administration, the first attempt was discovered. Another was discovered in late 1827.

On 23 December 1827, the Scottish Lodge declared the Plan of Montaño in Tulancingo (now state of Hidalgo), which was based on 4 points:

- The extinction of secret societies.
- The change of government.
- The expulsion of U.S. ambassador Joel R. Poinsett.
- Strict compliance with the Constitution.

Vice-president Nicolás Bravo, head of the revolt, claimed that his sole purpose was to release the Congress and the government of Victoria from the influence of the Yorkist Lodge. The plan called mainly for the reorganization of government, which had showed serious deficiencies in the control of public revenues and expulsion of the United States representative on the grounds that country meddled in domestic affairs. Joel R. Poinsett was expelled from Mexico on 3 January 1830 for that reason.

The uprising was suppressed by Vicente Guerrero on 6 January 1828 after a weak resistance. Nicolás Bravo was expelled from the country while other mutineers were imprisoned.

==== Mutiny of La Acordada ====
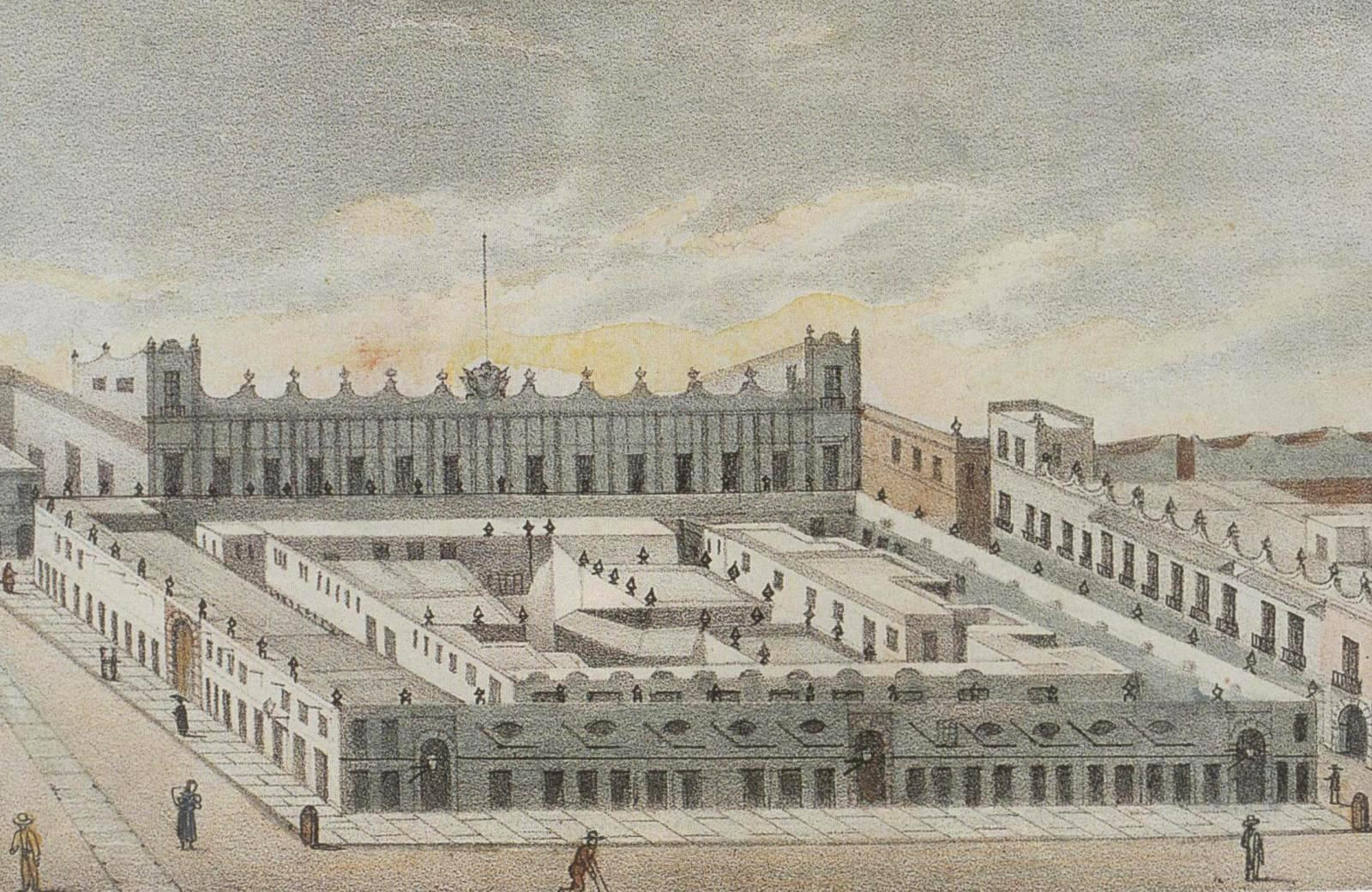
Lithograph of El Parian, 19th century.

See also Motín de la Acordada.

The Mutiny of La Acordada (Spanish: Motín de la Acordada) was a revolt staged on 30 November 1828 by General José María Lobato, Colonel Santiago García and Lorenzo de Zavala against the government of Guadalupe Victoria when they learned that he supported the candidacy of Manuel Gómez Pedraza in presidential elections.

For the elections of 1828, the Yorker Lodge presented as candidate to the Minister of War Manuel Gómez Pedraza. The Scottish Lodge presented as candidate to Vicente Guerrero, independence hero and victor in the last conspiracy against government. The elections were held on 1 September 1828, and the winner was Manuel Gómez Pedraza. Vicente Guerrero rejected the results and organized a revolution.

The revolutionary troops demanded the resignation of President Victoria and that he be replaced by Guerrero. Meanwhile, Gómez Pedraza fled from Mexico City, waiving his right to the presidency. That was seized upon by the mob which went to El Parian, the core of Mexican trade, and began looting and burning shops and stores, ruining hundreds of Spanish, Mexican and foreign traders.

As a result, in early 1829, Congress annulled the election of 1828 and elected Vicente Guerrero as president. Victoria delivered the presidency to him when his term ended on 1 April 1829.

=== Foreign affairs ===
One of the main goals of Guadalupe Victoria was recognition of Mexico as an independent nation by the principal foreign powers. He finally got that recognition following the establishment of diplomatic relations with the United Kingdom, the United States of America, the Federal Republic of Central America, and Gran Colombia. That reduced the problems caused by the economic embargo imposed by the Spanish crown. The economic problems were further reduced when several British companies began mining operations in Mexico, which resulted in a large influx of capitals.

He also ratified the contents of the Adams–Onís Treaty and thus the border with the United States.

Victoria declared that no proposals would be heard from Spain until it recognized Mexican independence and the form of government established and agreed to, and never ask for indemnification for the loss of Mexico.

Another memorable international accomplishment of Guadalupe Victoria was his support for the Pan American Union proposed by Simón Bolívar, which resulted in the signing of an agreement called the Tratado de Unión, Liga y Confederación Perpetua (Treaty of Union, League and Perpetual Confederation) between the republics of Colombia, Central America, Perú and the United Mexican States. He also provided financial assistance to Simón Bolívar to help obtain Peru's total independence from Spain.

== Later life ==
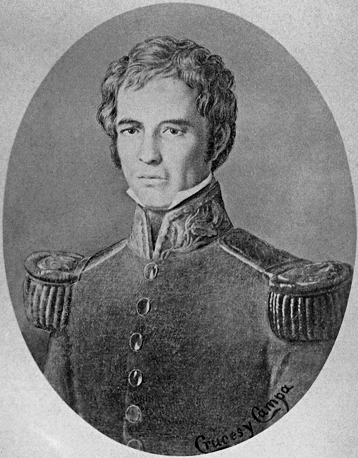
Photograph of Victoria by Cruces y Campa, c.1840s.

After completing his term, Victoria retired from public life to manage personal affairs in his hacienda El Jobo in Veracruz. When Victoria gave the presidency to his successor, Vicente Guerrero, he said:

"I ratified the promise to withdraw from all public business as ex president, but if the country were in danger and were needed to leave everything to save it, you know I will not hesitate to sacrifice myself...."

In 1832, the government of the republic, aware of his diplomatic and negotiating skills, asked him to assist in the pacification of Santa Anna, who had taken up arms to demand that the presidency to be delivered to General Manuel Gómez Pedraza. A year later, in 1833, he was elected senator for the states of Veracruz and Durango, joining the Public Debt Committee of the Senate. At the same time, he fought against rebellions in Veracruz and Oaxaca. While serving as senator, his health began to seriously deteriorate and he began having recurrent seizures which prevented him from completing his term as governor of Puebla, a position that he held for less than five months.

Victoria returned to the Senate and in 1835 was elected president of the Senate. He undertook a vigorous fight against a proposal that sought to change the federal republic to a centralized republic. A few days before returning to the Senate, in Puebla, he stated his position:

"Twenty-three years I have fought for your same cause and if new dangers will call me for your defense, you know that my vote is irrevocable: Federation or death."

In November 1836, he was appointed military commander of Veracruz, but he resigned in December to show disagreement to the proclamation of the first Central Republic.

In 1838, his diplomatic intervention was crucial to avoid a war against the French in the incident known as the Pastry War. On 9 March 1839, he was successful with the signing of a peace treaty with France. That was his last public activity.

== Death and legacy ==
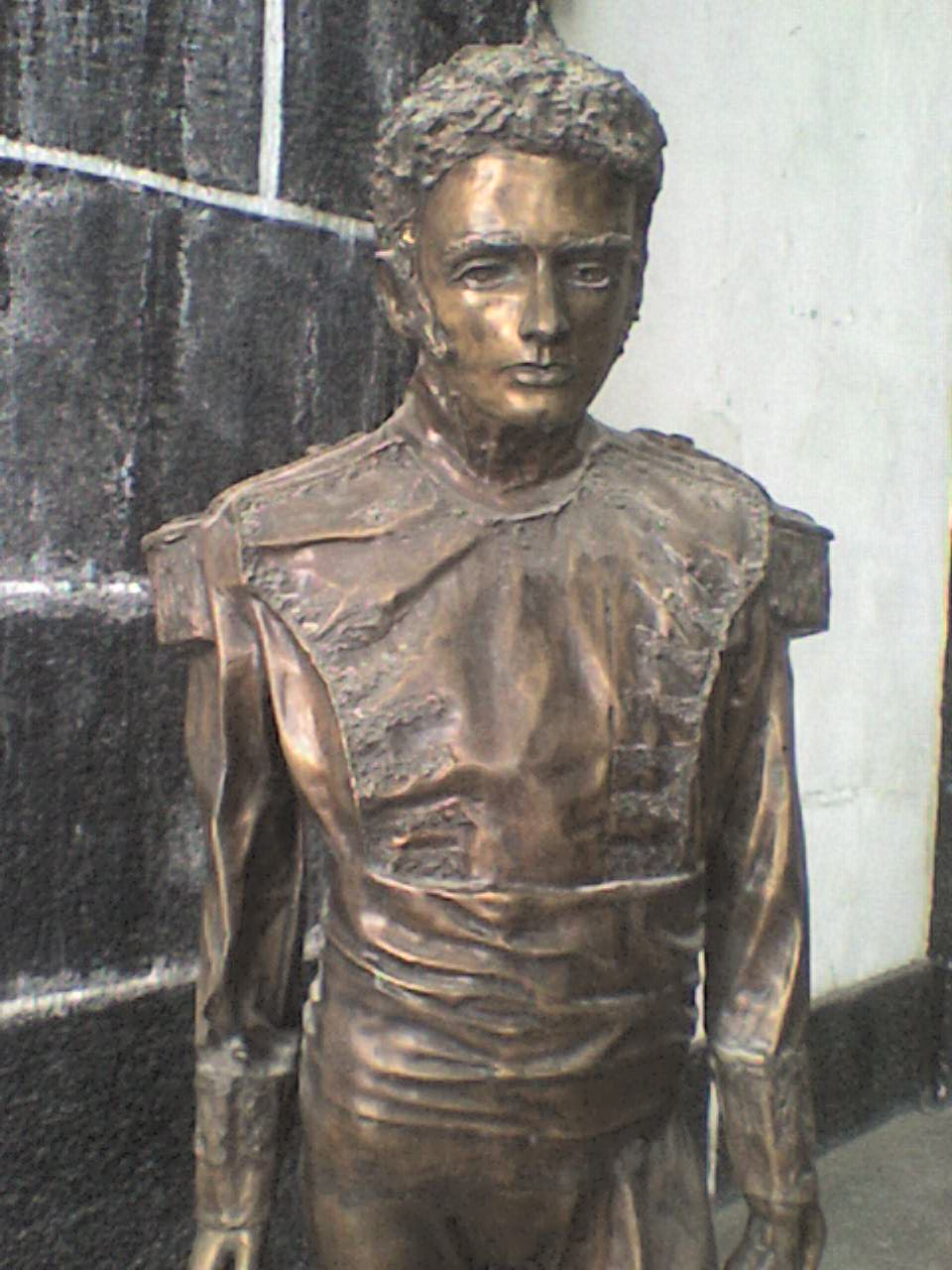
Bronze statue of the general Guadalupe Victoria of the Fort of San Carlos in Perote, Veracruz.

In 1841, he married María Antonieta Bretón y Velázquez, and very soon, his health was broken by his epileptic condition. He moved to the Castle of Perote to receive medical treatment. He died there on 21 March 1843, and was buried in the castle's chapel.

Victoria was declared by Congress Benemérito de la Patria (Worthy of the Nation) on 25 August 1843, and his name was written in golden letters in the session hall of the Chamber of Deputies.

In 1863, his remains were moved from Puebla by General Alejandro García and were placed in the Column of Independence in Mexico City.

On 15 August 2010, in celebration of the bicentennial of the beginning of the independence of Mexico, his remains were moved to National Palace and remained on display until 20 July 2011, when they were returned to the Column of Independence.

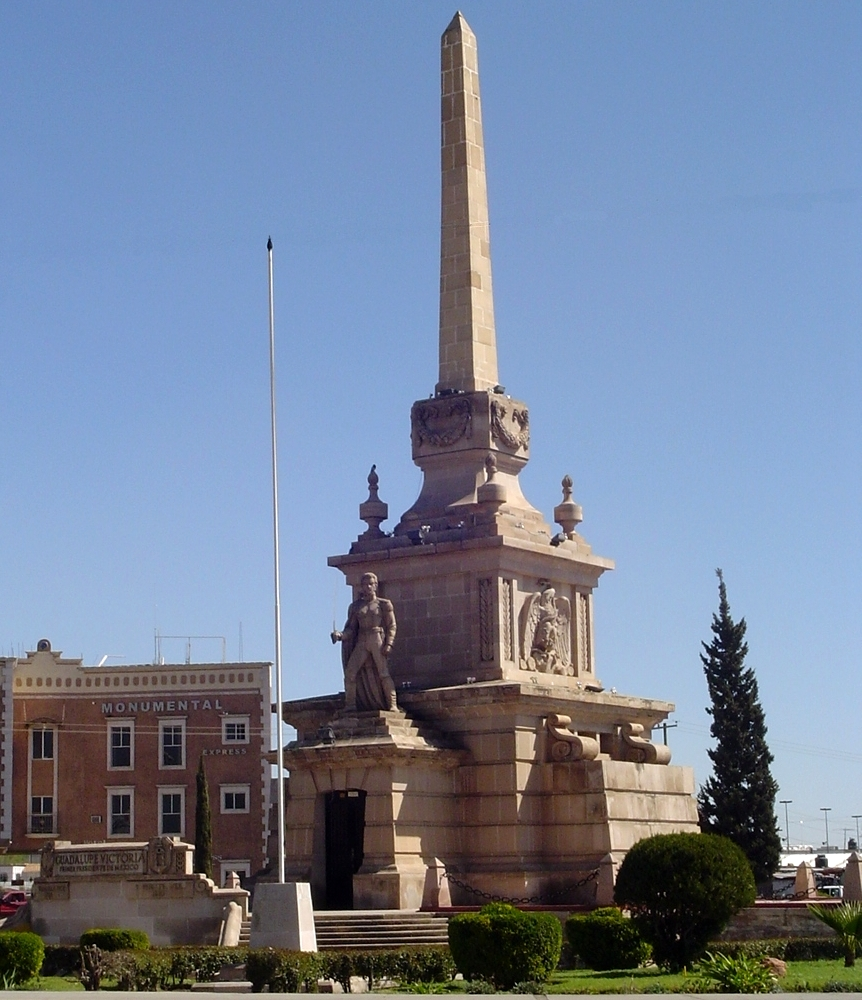
Victoria's monument in Durango.

Victoria is considered a national hero, and there are many monuments, statues, schools, hospitals, libraries, cities, towns, streets, and other places named after him in Mexico. The most prominent are Ciudad Victoria, the capital of the state of Tamaulipas; the capital city of Victoria de Durango, Tamazula de Victoria, and Ciudad Guadalupe Victoria in the state of Durango; Guadalupe Victoria in the state of Puebla; Victoria City and Victoria County, in the United States; the frigate ARM Victoria (F-213); and General Guadalupe Victoria International Airport.

=== Coins, stamps, and monuments ===
- A bust was presented to the City of Los Angeles of the United States in 1997 by the Mexican state of Durango. The bust is currently in Lincoln Park in the Lincoln Heights neighborhood.

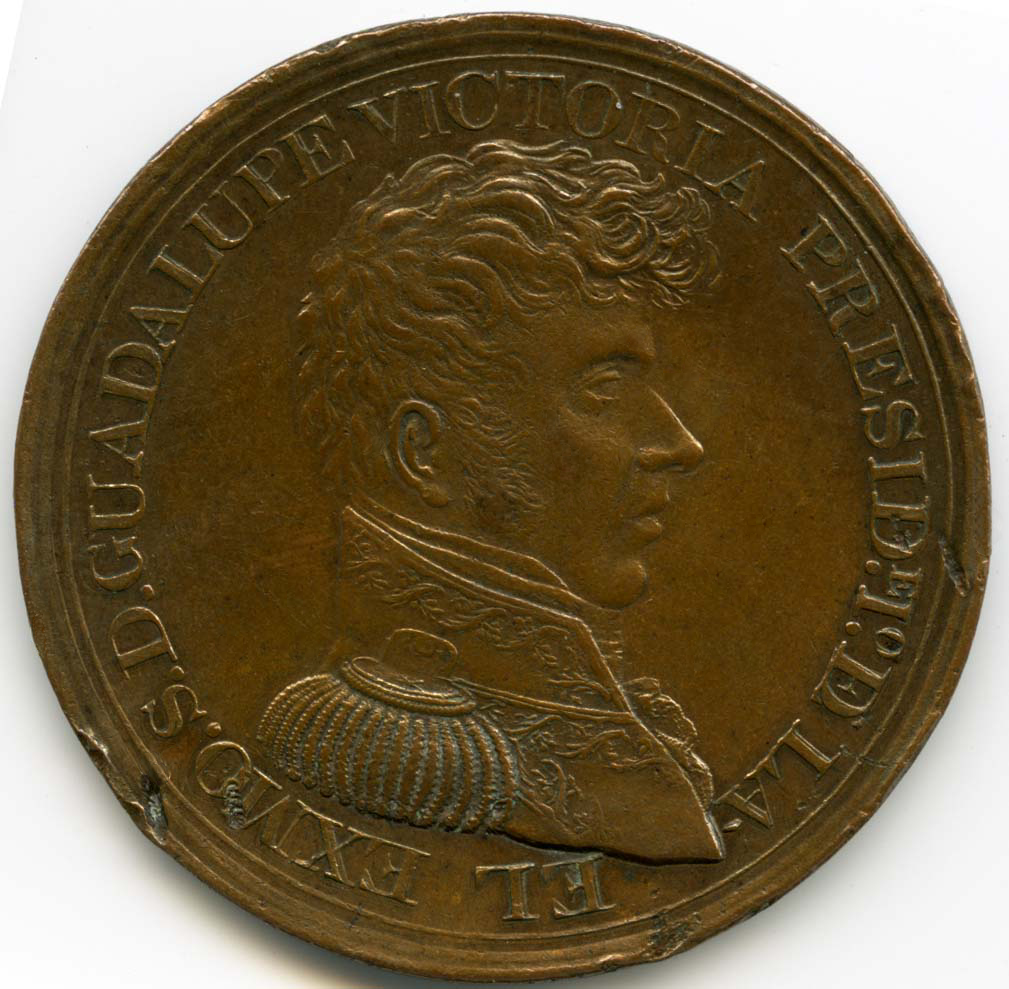
President Guadalupe Victoria, medal, 1824

== See also ==
- History of Mexico

== Notes ==
Political offices
| Preceded by Supreme Executive Power; Agustin de Iturbide (as Emperor of Mexico) | President of Mexico; 10 October 1824 – 1 April 1829 | Succeeded by Vicente Guerrero |
