= Nicolás Bravo =

President of Mexico in 1839, from 1842 to 1843, in 1846

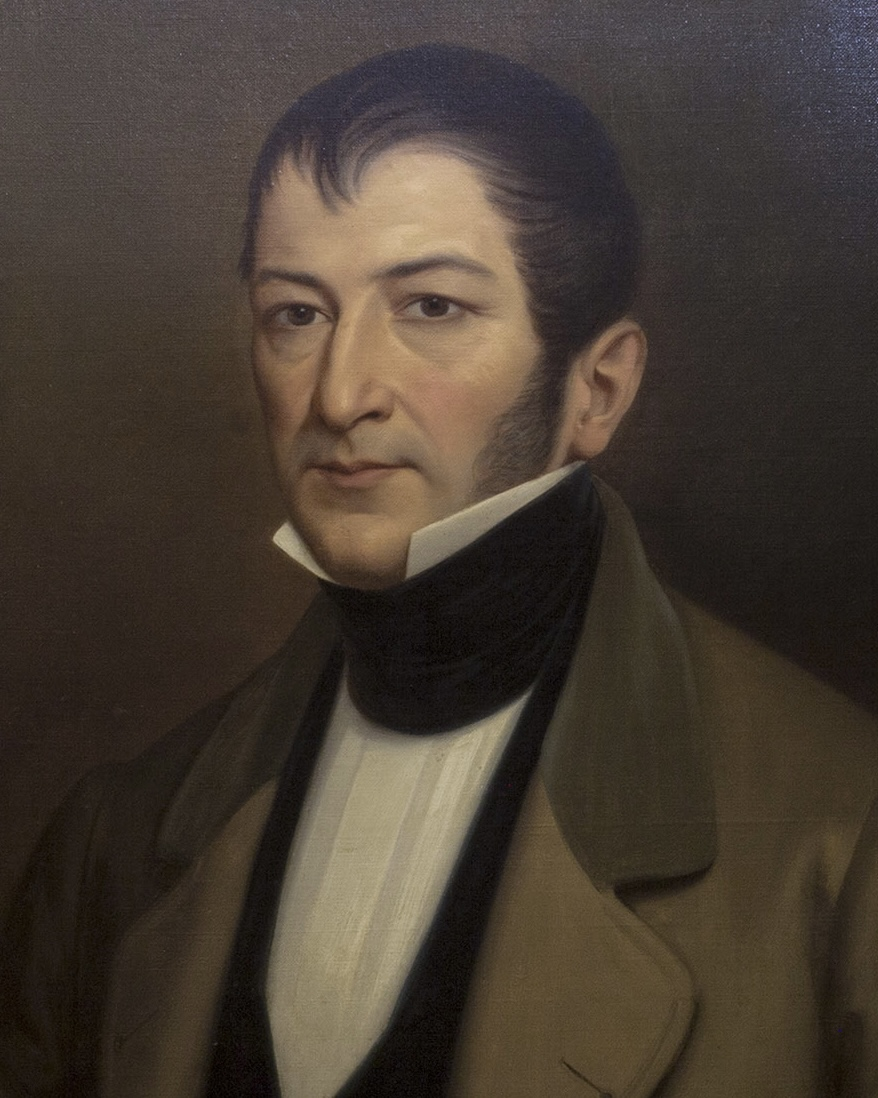

11th President of Mexico
- In office 10 – 19 July 1839
- Preceded by: Antonio López de Santa Anna
- Succeeded by: Anastasio Bustamante
- In office 26 October 1842 – 14 May 1843
- Preceded by: Antonio López de Santa Anna
- Succeeded by: Antonio López de Santa Anna
- In office 28 July – 4 August 1846
- Vice President: Himself
- Preceded by: Mariano Paredes
- Succeeded by: José Mariano Salas

Member of the Second Regence of the Mexican Empire
- In office 11 April – 18 May 1822
- President: Agustín de Iturbide

1st Vice President of United Mexican States
- In office 10 October 1824 – 23 December 1827
- President: Guadalupe Victoria
- Succeeded by: Anastasio Bustamante

4th Vice President of Mexican Republic
- In office 12 June – 6 August 1846
- President: Mariano Paredes; Himself
- Preceded by: Antonio Lopez de Santa Anna
- Succeeded by: Valentín Gómez Farías

Personal details
- Born: 10 September 1786 Chichihualco, New Spain
- Died: 22 April 1854 (aged 67) Chilpancingo, Guerrero, Mexico
- Party: Centralist Party; Conservative Party

Nicolás Bravo Rueda (10 September 1786 – 22 April 1854) was a Mexican soldier and politician who served as interim President of Mexico three times, in 1839, 1842, and 1846. Prior to his presidency, he fought in the Mexican War of Independence and served as Mexico's first Vice President under President Guadalupe Victoria from 1824 until 1827, when he attempted to overthrow Victoria. He was also the fourth vice president under President Mariano Paredes in 1846, and served in the Mexican–American War.

Bravo first distinguished himself during the Mexican War of Independence. In 1827, while serving as Vice President, Bravo attempted to overthrow President Guadalupe Victoria through the Plan of Montaño. His revolt failed, though in part due to the services Bravo had provided the nation during the War of Independence, he was spared from execution, but nonetheless exiled.

Bravo later returned to Mexico and went on to serve as interim president of Mexico three separate times in 1839, 1842, and 1846. During his second presidency he oversaw the transition of the Centralist Republic of Mexico to a new constitution known as the Bases Orgánicas. During the Mexican–American War he commanded the Mexican forces at the Battle of Chapultepec.

== Early life ==
Bravo was born on 10 September 1786, at the Hacienda de Chichihualco, an estate outside of Chilpancingo, to a wealthy family. His parents were Leonardo Bravo and Gertrudis Rueda de Bravo. After the Mexican War of Independence broke out in September 1810, Nicolás, along with his father and a brother, joined the insurgents. He served directly under his father at first and after two years was given command of a body of troops that passed to the province of Veracruz and took control of Coscomatepec. After a victory at Palma, he experienced the defeat, imprisonment, and death of his father. Bravo later gained a reputation for clemency after releasing three hundred Royalist prisoners.

Bravo was captured in 1817 in the south of the country and transported to the capital, where he remained imprisoned for three years, until he was amnestied by the liberal Spanish government of 1820. He then joined Agustín de Iturbide's Plan of Iguala in 1821, and Iturbide promoted him to colonel. The Constituent Congress named him to the council of state and a member of the regency, which governed until Iturbide took over as Emperor of the First Mexican Empire.

== First Mexican Empire ==
As Iturbide became more autocratic and Santa Anna proclaimed the Plan of Veracruz against him in 1823, Bravo once again decided to fight against the government. He left Mexico City on 5 January 1823, being joined by Vicente Guerrero, and they planned to raise a revolution in the south of the country, carrying with them a copy of the Plan of Veracruz provided to them by Santa Anna. He received money for his campaign from María Petra Teruel de Velasco, wife of Antonio Velasco, a passionate supporter of the movement, who pawned some jewels in order to gather all of the required funds. Iturbide was alerted of Bravo and Guerrero's whereabouts through the mayor of Mexicaltzingo, and promptly sent a lieutenant colonel after them, but Bravo was able to evade capture by simply bribing him.

Brigadier José Gabriel de Armijo, commander of the South, however, now went after them, and a skirmish ensued in the vicinity of Almolonga, where they were then defeated. Guerrero was shot through the lungs and his men fled the scene in panic, in spite of Bravo's efforts to stop them, believing Guerrero to be dead.

Bravo fled to the Santa Rosa ranch, and from here he sought to reorganize in the Mixteca region, where he intended to join Antonio Leon at Huajuapam. He fortified himself at a place called the Junta de los Rios. From there he headed towards Oaxaca. Bravo was in the process of arranging a governing junta when he learned of the Plan of Casa Mata. With the troops that he was able to gather at Oaxaca, he headed out and entered the capital with the rest of the insurgent army. Emperor Iturbide restored the congress and offered his abdication. When congress decreed that Iturbide be moved to Tulancingo, the former emperor chose Bravo to escort him and his family, although it later seemed Iturbide lost his trust in Bravo as he asked his guards to keep a watch over him.

== First Republic ==
After Iturbide was deposed, Bravo was made a member of the Supreme Executive Power, the triumvirate now serving as the executive. During this period he continued to pacify the country and carried out a victorious campaign in Jalisco against the Iturbidist General Luis de Quintanar.

=== Vice Presidency ===
During the newly established First Mexican Republic, Bravo preferred a strong unitary government for the country and allied himself with the Centralist party, to which were also allied various conservative interests ranging from the remaining Spaniards in the country to the upper classes and the clergy. Politics in Mexico at this time was associated with Masonic lodges, and the conservatives met within lodges of the Scottish Rite, consequently being known as the Escoceses, in which Bravo acquired a position of leadership. The Escoceses were opposed by the federalists, who preferred the country to be governed by a federal system, and with which were associated various liberal causes. They too met within Masonic lodges but instead were followers of the York Rite, and so were known as Yorkinos. Mexico's constitution, modeled after that of the United States, decreed that the winner of the presidential election became president while second place became vice president. In the elections of 1824, Bravo finished in second place and thus was elected to be the nation's first vice-president, while the hero of the War of Independence, Guadalupe Victoria, finished in first place and was elected president, even though the two men belonged to opposite parties, with Victoria being a Yorkino and Bravo being an Escocés.

On 23 December 1827, the Escoceses, led by Vice President Bravo, proclaimed the Plan de Montaño, demanding the expulsion of the American ambassador Joel Poinsett, an end to secret societies, and the dismissal of the current cabinet, the latter measure due to the belief that the Yorkino-dominated government was about to take decisive measures to suppress the Escoceses. The insurrection was short-lived and Bravo was defeated at Tulancingo by his former ally Vicente Guerrero.

Bravo was tried before a grand jury, and the case went to the Supreme Court. Although the law prescribed a severe punishment for his treason, his services during the Mexican War of Independence won him sympathy from his old colleagues who asked for clemency, and even President Victoria preferred leniency, so the court simply condemned him to banishment for two years.

=== Further military career ===
Bravo departed from Acapulco to South America and on the journey he lost his only child. His exile was shortened due to an amnesty granted by President Vicente Guerrero, and Bravo returned to Mexico in 1829.

He continued to be a supporter of the Conservative Party and joined the Plan of Jalapa against President Guerrero that same year. After personally going out to lead his troops against the insurrection, President Guerrero was deposed at the capital in January 1830 and replaced by the conservative Anastasio Bustamante. Guerrero, however, remained at large and continued to wage warfare against the government in the south of the country when Bravo occupied the port and fortress of Acapulco, hoping to remove an important source of wealth from Guerrero and his supporters, but Bravo was dislodged from the city. Bravo was later victorious at Chilpancingo in January 1831, for which congress granted him a sword of honor, considering that the victory was a decisive defeat against the ongoing operations of Guerrero.

Bustamante's conservative government fell to an insurrection known as the Plan of Veracruz in 1832, and Bravo was initially reluctant to recognize the rebels, but Santa Anna, who had played a key role in the Plan of Veracruz, eventually won him over.

== Centralist Republic of Mexico ==
In 1834, the nation experienced a revolution that eventually resulted in a new constitution and the inauguration of the Centralist Republic of Mexico. In 1836, shortly after Mexico lost Texas in the Texas Revolution, Bravo was in charge of the army of the north, but retired, disgusted by the events, to Chilpancingo.

=== First Presidency ===
Anastasio Bustamante had meanwhile returned to the presidency, and in 1839, Bravo was invited to be a part of his council of state. When Bustamante temporarily stepped down from the presidency to lead the troops against the rebellion of José de Urrea, Bravo was named by congress the interim president of the Republic on 10 July 1839.

There was much dissatisfaction with the state of the country at this time and a great public clamor for constitutional reform, which included many generals and commanders. President Bravo wished for such concerns to be addressed through legal channels, and he directed his council of state to urge the Supreme Moderating Power, a governing council that according to the constitution was above even the president, to declare that it was the will of the nation to reform the constitution, at the direction of the national representatives, without waiting for a more suitable time.

This first presidency ultimately lasted only nine days, and yet Bravo attended to his duties with energy and dedication. When the criminal Yanez, condemned to death by hanging for highway robbery, slit his own throat to avoid the hangman, friends of the family pleaded that the body not be displayed in public, but Bravo decreed that the body be displayed on the gallows anyway to serve as a warning.

=== Second Presidency ===
Bravo next became president in 1842, during which the Centralist Republic of Mexico experienced a constitutional change. In response to multiple national crises, on 8 August 1841, Mariano Paredes proclaimed against the government of Anastasio Bustamante, and when his insurgent troops reached the city of Tacubaya they were joined by Santa Anna. After failing to put down the insurgency, Bustamante officially surrendered power through the Estanzuela Accords on 6 October 1841. A military junta was formed which wrote the Bases of Tacubaya, a plan which swept away the entire structure of government, except the judiciary, and also called for elections for a new constituent congress meant to write a new constitution.

The subsequent congress, installed on 10 June 1842, was strongly federalist, against the wishes of the organizers of the Bases of Tacubaya who were strongly centralist. Santa Anna began to scheme to dissolve the congress, and left Bravo in charge of the presidency on 26 October 1842. Bravo was not in accord with Santa Anna's schemes for while he too was a centralist, he did not wish to overturn the results of the election which had led to the strongly federal congress. Tornel, the minister of war, was the real power at the capital at this time, being the favorite of Santa Anna.

President Bravo assured a commission sent by congress that he would accept the new constitution, and congress continued working on its draft until its work was interrupted by a pronunciamiento in the obscure town of Huejotzingo, calling for the dissolution of congress and demanding the installation of a council of notables to work on the new constitution. Minister Tornel was among the conspirators promoting the revolution. In spite of his earlier reluctance to go against congress and reassurance towards them, at the decisive hour, Bravo sided with the insurrectionists and on 19 December, he signed a decree signed by Bocanegra, Velez, Gorostiza, and Tornel dissolving congress and decreeing that they be replaced by a Junta of Notables.

In the early dawn hours of that day there had been skirmishes in the Ciudadela and throughout the morning the Celaya Battalion had remained stationed in the corridor contiguous to the hall where congress met in order to prevent the deputies from entering. Most of them met at the home of the president of the congress Francisco Elorriaga and they directed a memo to President Bravo, asking him if they could continue their sessions, and the reply explained that "every garrison has pronounced against congress except myself and the commandant general of Mexico State." Most deputies then agreed to publish a manifesto explaining that the executive which had long been interfering with their labors had now used armed forces to dissolve the congress.

While Bravo himself was against the dissolution of congress, he made it so that the Junta of Notables would be composed of individuals known for their knowledge and patriotism. The Junta was to last six months, during which the Bases of Tacubaya would reign as a provisional constitution. The council of government would continue to function. Another decree on 23 December declared that the Junta of Notables would call itself the national legislature, and the eighty individuals who were to make it up were finally named.

The Junta opened its sessions on 6 January 1843, and General Valencia and Quintana Roo were elected president and vice president of the congress, respectively. The Departmental Juntas which had not supported the Bases of Tacubaya were dissolved. During this time President Bravo established the medical-military Health Corp, and also established a mint in Culicacan. He also recruited 440 men into the military and declared that official stationery must only use paper manufactured in Mexico.

Bravo and Santa Anna became suspicious of Mariano Paredes who had played such a key role in establishing the Bases of Tacubaya, but who now began to express dissatisfaction with the government. He was invited to join the Junta and then made commandant general of Mexico State, and later arrested for speaking against the government, but eventually acquitted. Bravo eventually resigned on 5 May, after growing tired of playing the role of Santa Anna's puppet.

== Mexican–American War ==
Bravo retired temporarily from politics until the end of 1844, when he was called by the government to help suppress an uprising that had flared up in Chilapa. The insurrection was being carried out by individuals who had published no political manifesto, and were simply looting properties. Meanwhile, a revolution had begun against the government of Santa Anna and Valentin Canalizo, and eventually Jose Joaquin Herrera ascended to the presidency on 6 December 1844. Bravo was named head of the national armies, and went after the deposed Santa Anna.

Bravo joined in the revolution, when the conservative Mariano Paredes overthrew the government of Herrera in late 1845, claiming that the president was committing treason by attempting to recognize the independence of Texas. Paredes was elected president by a junta on 3 January, and Bravo was elected vice-president. Bravo was awarded by making him commandant general and governor of the department of Mexico, when the Mexican–American War had already begun in April 1846. He was named general and chief of the forces destined for the departments of Puebla, Oaxaca, Veracruz, and Tabasco, and he published a proclamation calling for the unity of all parties.

Amidst increasing opposition to his policies, and the conduct of the war which had been so far a grievous set of defeats for Mexico, Mariano Paredes stepped down and passed the presidency over to Bravo on 28 July 1846.

=== Third Presidency ===
Bravo was summoned to the capital from the department of Veracruz where he was in the middle of fortifying the city against a potential assault, and replaced with General Mosso. Four days after he assumed the presidency, on 3 August, the garrison of Vera Cruz and San Juan de Ulua revolted, proclaiming the plan of Guadalajara, and early on the morning of 4 August, General Salas with more than a thousand troops revolted in the capital. The former president Paredes fled the city on that same night, intending to go off to the front to lead some troops he had dispatched, but he was arrested and sent back by General Avalos. At a conference held by the belligerents, including Vizcaino Lemus, and Jose Ramon Pacheco, Martin Carrera, Jose Urrea, and Ramon Moralies, on 6 August it was agreed that Bravo should step down. Power would pass over to General Salas.

=== Battle of Chapultepec ===
Bravo continued to participate in the war effort, and was named commandant general of the Department of Puebla, but he retreated from that city when orders arrived to fall back on the capital. He took part in the efforts to defend the capital and he was assigned to the southern boundary of the city, which had previously belonged to General Andrade. After the defeats of Molino del Rey and Casa Mata he was placed in charge of defending the Chapultepec with two thousand troops, with Monterde, director of the fortifications there, as his second-in-command. The place began to be bombarded on 12 September, and an assault followed the next day, which ultimately ended in a Mexican defeat, and Bravo was taken prisoner.

During the Battle of Chapultepec, Bravo had asked for reinforcements and only the Battalion of San Blas commanded by Xicotencatl could help. Bravo's reputation suffered in the aftermath of the loss, for in the official report by Santa Anna he assured that Bravo had been taken prisoner after hiding in a waterlogged trench, submerged up to the neck, after which he was recognized by his white hair.

== Later life ==
After the war Bravo attempted to defend his reputation. He retired to Chilpancingo where he lived in obscurity until he died in April 1854. He had coincidentally died on the same day as his wife, leading to rumors that both had been murdered. The fact that Santa Anna at the time was in the vicinity fighting the insurrection that had flared up due to the Plan of Ayutla, also gave rise to rumors that he may have been involved in their deaths.

== See also ==
- List of heads of state of Mexico
