= Plan of Casa Mata =

1823 call to establish a Mexican republic

In the history of Mexico, the Plan of Casa Mata (Spanish: Plan de Casa Mata) was an 1823 plan formulated to elect a new constituent congress, which the monarchy of Agustín de Iturbide had dissolved in 1822. The Plan of Casa Mata sought to establish a republic.

Antonio López de Santa Anna and Guadalupe Victoria signed the Plan de Casa Mata which was issued on February 1, 1823, as a beginning to their efforts to overthrow Emperor of Mexico Agustín de Iturbide. Iturbide had formulated the Plan of Iguala in 1821, which united insurgents and royalist forces and Mexico's independence in September 1821. The plan called for a constitutional monarchy, and when no European monarch presented himself as a candidate, the Mexican Congress proclaimed Iturbide as Emperor of Mexico in May 1822. Commanding the country as he had commanded the army, he dissolved the Congress and ordered dissidents imprisoned.

Several insurrections arose in the provinces and were choked by the army, except for the one headed by Santa Anna in Veracruz, because he had an agreement with General Echávarri, who commanded the imperial forces that fought Santa Anna. By agreement of the two the Plan de Casa Mata was proclaimed on February 1, 1823. This plan did not recognize the First Mexican Empire and called for a new Constituent Congress. The insurrectionists sent their proposal to the provincial delegations and requested their support for the plan. In the course of only six weeks, the Plan de Casa Mata had arrived at remote places, like Texas, and almost all the provinces had been united behind the plan.

When a provincial delegation accepted the Plan de Casa Mata, it withdrew its allegiance from the imperial government and asserted sovereignty within its province. Agustín de Iturbide was isolated without support outside of Mexico City and some factions of the army. He reinstated the dissolved constituent Congress, abdicated the crown, and left the country in March 1823, for Italian exile with the promise of a 25,000 peso annual payment if he remained there. The 1824 Constitution was adopted the following year.

== Articles ==
- Art. 1. It being indisputable that sovereignty resides exclusively in the nation, Congress shall be installed at the earliest possible moment.
- Art. 2. The convocation shall be made on the basis prescribed for the first ones.
- Art. 3. In view of the fact that among the deputies who formed the disbanded Congress, there were some who because of their liberal ideas and firmness of character won public appreciation, while others did not fulfill properly the confidence placed in them, the provinces shall be free to reelect the former, and to replace the latter with individuals more capable of the performance of their arduous obligations.
- Art. 4. As soon as the representatives of the nation shall be united, they shall fix their residence in the city or town that they think best in order to begin their sessions.
- Art. 5. The bodies that compose this army, and those that may adhere to this plan in the future, shall swear to sustain at all costs the national representation and all its fundamental decisions.
- Art. 6. The leaders, officers, and troops who are not willing to sacrifice themselves for the good of the country shall be allowed to go where they wish.
- Art. 7. A committee shall be named to take copies of the plan to the capital of the Empire to place them in the hands of His Majesty the Emperor.
- Art. 8. Another committee with a copy [shall go] to Vera Cruz to propose to the governor and official bodies there what has been agreed by the army, to see if they will adhere to it or not.
- Art. 9. Another [shall be sent] to the chiefs of the bodies of this army which are besieging El Puente and are in the cities.
- Art. 10. Until an answer is received from the Supreme Government concerning the agreement by the army, the provincial deputation of this province shall be the one to deliberate on administrative affairs, if the former resolution should meet with its approval.
- Art. 11. The army shall never harm the person of the Emperor, since it considers that his position shall be decided by the national representation. The former shall station itself in the cities, or wherever circumstances demand, and shall not be broken up on any pretext until the Sovereign Congress so disposes, since the latter shall be sustained by the army in its deliberations.

== See also ==
- Plans in Mexican history
- History of democracy in Mexico
