= Melchor Múzquiz =

President of Mexico in 1832

The Most Excellent Melchor Múzquiz
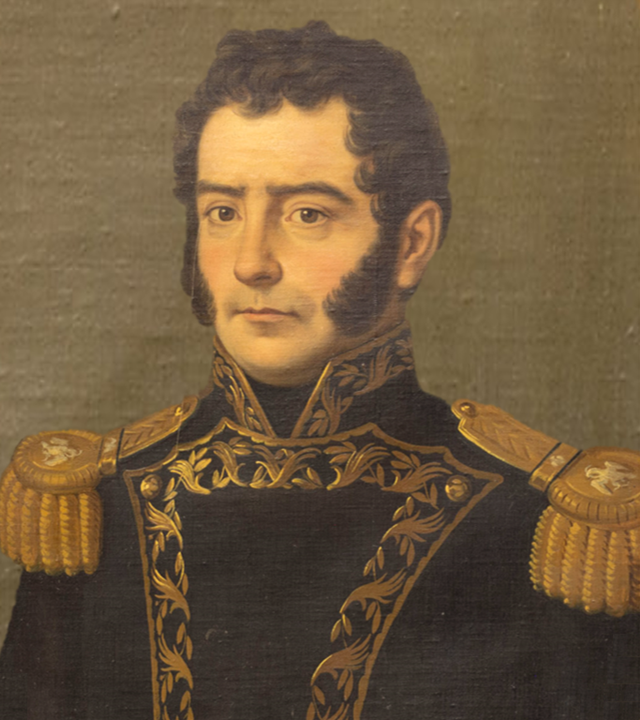

5th President of Mexico
- In office 14 August – 24 December 1832
- Vice President: Anastasio Bustamante (Note: Bustamante was elected as Vice President with President Vicente Guerrero in 1829, and technically still inhabited the role through the next several presidencies, including his own. Múzquiz was the last president he served as vice president to.)
- Preceded by: Anastasio Bustamante
- Succeeded by: Manuel Gómez Pedraza

1st Governor of the State of Mexico
- In office 12 March 1831 – 12 March 1834
- Preceded by: Lorenzo de Zavala
- Succeeded by: Lorenzo de Zavala
- In office 27 September 1824 – 8 March 1827
- Preceded by: Manuel Gómez Pedraza
- Succeeded by: Lorenzo de Zavala
- In office 2 – 4 March 1824
- Preceded by: office established
- Succeeded by: Manuel Gómez Pedraza

Personal details
- Born: 6 April 1788 Santa Rosa, New Spain (now Melchor Múzquiz City, Coahuila, Mexico)
- Died: 14 December 1844 (aged 56) Mexico City
- Spouse: Joaquina Bezares

José Ventura Melchor Ciriaco de Ecay-Múzquiz y Arrieta (6 April 1788 – 14 December 1844) was a Mexican soldier and politician who became the 5th President of Mexico after president Anastasio Bustamante stepped down to personally lead his armies against an 1832 insurgency known as the Plan of Veracruz.

Múzquiz played an active role in attempting to suppress the revolt, but the revolution would succeed, and Múzquiz was forced to step down in December 1832 in favor of the insurgents’ chosen president, Manuel Gómez Pedraza. He was brother of the governor of Coahuila y Tejas José Rafael Eca y Múzquiz, who governed the state five times.

== Early life ==
Melchor Múzquiz was born in Santa Rosa, Coahuila in 1788 and began his studies at the Colegio de San Ildefonso in Mexico City from which he left to join the insurgents when the Mexican War of Independence broke out in 1810. He fought against the Spanish in Michoacán and Veracruz and was taken prisoner at the Hacienda of Monte Blanco at the time when he had reached the rank of colonel. He was transported to Puebla and was at the point of being executed by firing squad, when he was saved by an amnesty, but he refused to swear that upon release he would no longer take up arms against Spain.

== Early political career ==
He joined Agustín de Iturbide's Plan of Iguala which finally gained independence for Mexico in 1821, and by 1824 he was governor of the State of Mexico, and was known for maintaining budget surpluses. Under the administration of President Guadalupe Victoria he was made brigadier general and was given the post of commandant general of Puebla when the Revolution of the Acordada broke out against president-elect and Minister of War Manuel Gómez Pedraza in the aftermath of the contested election of 1828. Múzquiz refused to join the revolution, yet he also did not proclaim loyalty to the government considering it a captive of the revolutionaries who now occupied the capital. President elect Gómez Pedraza fled the country and eventually, Múzquiz recognized the newly established government of Vicente Guerrero.

Only one year later, in 1829, Múzquiz actively supported the Plan of Jalapa aimed at overthrowing President Guerrero and replacing him with vice-president Anastasio Bustamante. The leading rebels met in Múzquiz' own home to read the plan upon where Múzquiz asked each man present if they would accept it. From this point, Múzquiz would be considered Bustamante's second-in-command.

== Plan of Veracruz ==
On January 2, 1832, a liberal revolt against the government flared up in Veracruz, demanding the dismissal of President Bustamante's ministers. Santa Anna joined the movement and on January 4, he addressed himself to President Bustamante offering to mediate in order to prevent bloodshed.

The government failed to defeat Santa Anna, and the revolution spread to Tamaulipas, where the rebels routed the forces of Manuel de Mier y Terán at Tampico. Now the revolution was joined by more states, who began to demand not only the dismissal of the ministers but the replacement of Bustamante himself with Manuel Gómez Pedraza who had won the elections of 1828 before fleeing the country in the aftermath of Vicente Guerrero's revolt against him. Meanwhile the states of San Luis Potosi, Michoacan, Chihuahua, Mexico, Puebla, and Tabasco remained loyal to Bustamante, but the revolution continued to advance.

=== Interim presidency ===
The government was shaken by the news that the up until then loyal city of San Luis Potosi was captured by the rebel general José Esteban Moctezuma on August 6, and President Bustamante assumed personal command of the troops in order to lead an expedition against him. Bustamante stepped down as president and the deputies elected General Melchor Múzquiz to assume the role of interim president on August 14. President Múzquiz struggled to fund the armies of Minister of War José Antonio Facio and Bustamante, and could not obtain loans while the country was in a state of civil war.

Bustamante routed the forces of Moctezuma on September 18, and occupied the San Luis Potosi on September 30. Unfortunately for the government, General Gabriel Valencia then proclaimed his support for the revolution in the state of Mexico, putting him in a position to threaten the capital. Bustamante turned back towards Mexico City and reached Peñón Blanco where he obtained a promise from Governor Francisco García Salinas of the state of Zacatecas to support the government, a promise which was later broken. Meanwhile in Veracruz after a six-month stalemate, Santa Anna defeated government forces led by Facio, allowing his army to leave Veracruz and advance upon the capital reaching Tacubaya on October 6.

The Múzquiz administration sent circulars to loyal governors, and redoubled its efforts to maintain itself. Half of his ministers were opposed by the revolutionists but Múzquiz did not make any personnel changes in response. Congress also refused to negotiate with the rebels by placing Gómez Pedraza in charge of the executive, and instead granted Melchor Múzquiz emergency powers. Commissioners were sent to negotiate with Santa Anna, who was at the gates of the capital, but no agreement was reached.

At this point, however, Santa Anna headed away from Mexico City on November 6 to face the approaching army of Bustamante at the city of Puebla, and defeated him on November 16. By now government had effectively lost control over the rest of the nation, retaining the loyalty of only Oaxaca and Chihuahua. Bustamante gave up the military struggle and opened negotiations at which it was agreed to enter into an armistice until congress could approve a peace treaty between the parties. Múzquiz himself wished to agree to an armistice, but congress refused to surrender. Múzquiz would resign in opposition on December 15, but his resignation was rejected. However Bustamante disobeyed congress to avert further bloodshed and proceeded to negotiate a peace that was ratified on December 23, 1832, through the Treaty of Zavaleta. In accordance with the treaty, the presidency now passed on to Manuel Gómez Pedraza. A group of commissioners arrived from the triumphant rebels to announce to the now ex-president Múzquiz that he was free to go home.

== Later life ==
He remained retired from public affairs for a time. In 1836, under the Centralist Republic of Mexico during which Mexico was divided into departments rather than states, he was president of the Supreme Moderating Power, a council established by the Siete Leyes that was constitutionally even above the president. He pursued constitutional reforms in the fields of finance, justice, and the authorities of the departments. He would be appointed to the Supreme Moderating Power once more in 1840. Múzquiz died on December 14, 1844, in poverty despite the exalted positions which he once held. Afterwards his hometown was renamed after him.

== See also ==
- List of heads of state of Mexico

== Bibliography ==
- (in Spanish) "Múzquiz, Melchor", Enciclopedia de México, vol. 10. Mexico City, 1996, ISBN 1-56409-016-7.
- (in Spanish) García Puron, Manuel, México y sus gobernantes, v. 2. Mexico City: Joaquín Porrúa, 1984.
- (in Spanish) Orozco Linares, Fernando, Gobernantes de México. Mexico City: Panorama Editorial, 1985, ISBN 968-38-0260-5.

Political offices
Preceded by Anastasio Bustamante	President of Mexico; 14 August - 24 December 1832	Succeeded by Manuel Gómez Pedraza
