= Miguel Ramos Arizpe =

Mexican priest and politician

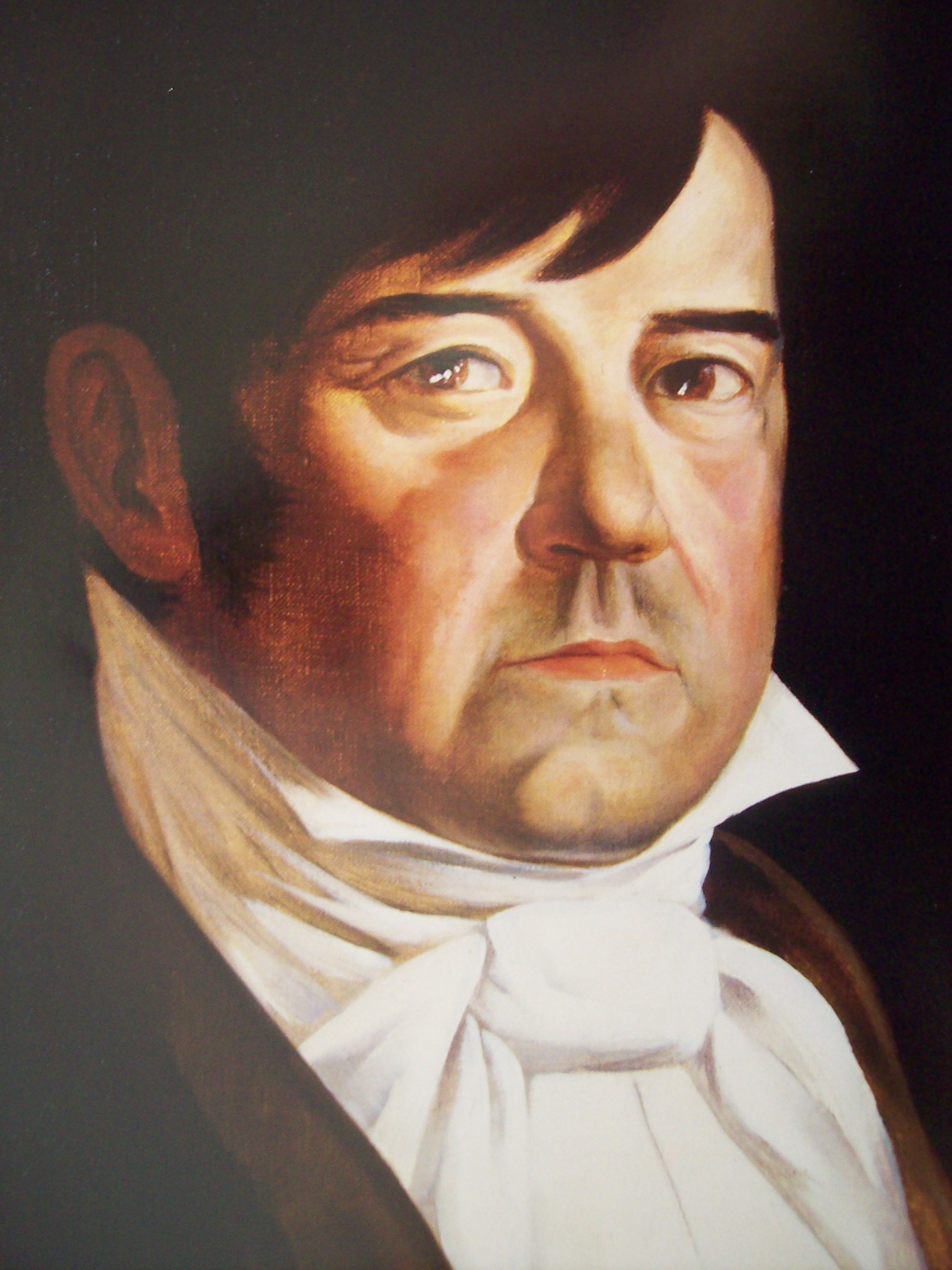
- Miguel Ramos Arizpe, Museo Nacional de las Intervenciones

17th Minister of Finance
- In office 5 January 1833 – 1 February 1833
- President: Manuel Gómez Pedraza
- Preceded by: Ignacio Alas
- Succeeded by: Valentín Gómez Farías

6th Minister of Justice and Ecclesiastical Affairs
- In office 30 November 1825 – 7 March 1827
- President: Guadalupe Victoria
- Preceded by: Pablo de La Llave
- Succeeded by: Juan José Espinoza de los Monteros

Personal details
- Born: 15 February 1775 Valle de San Nicolás, New Spain
- Died: 28 April 1843 (aged 68) Mexico City, Mexico
- Resting place: Panteón de Dolores
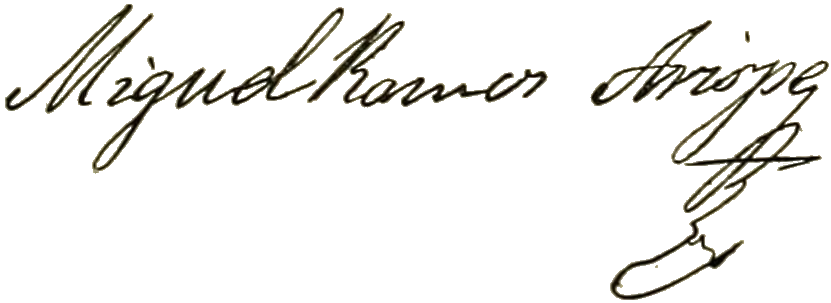
- Signature

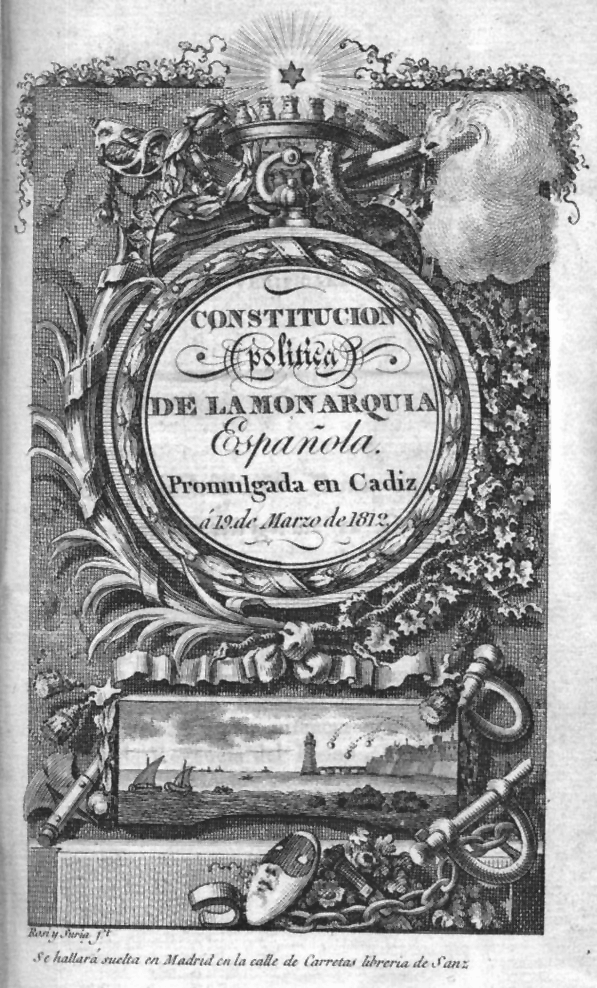
Spanish Constitution of 1812

Don Miguel Ramos Arizpe (February 15, 1775 in Valle de San Nicolás, (near Saltillo) Coahuila – April 28, 1843 in Mexico City) was a Mexican priest and politician, and known as "the father of Mexican federalism."

== Life and career ==
Ramos Arizpe was born near Saltillo, Coahuila, in colonial Mexico's Eastern Provincias Internas in 1775. He studied in a seminary in Monterrey, with the usual curriculum of Latin, philosophy, and moral theology. He went on to study in Guadalajara, where he earned his bachelor's degree studying philosophy and law. He was ordained a priest in 1803, returning to Monterrey, and held a number of ecclesiastical positions in the area. He earned his doctorate in canon law in 1807. He served in the Cortes of Cádiz, representing Coahuila, where "he demanded equality between Europeans and Americans." During the Bourbon reforms of the late eighteenth century, the Spanish crown had begun systematically privileging peninsular-born Spaniards over American-born criollos, so the demand for equality of these elites was in opposition to crown policy.

During the Napoleonic invasion of the Iberian peninsula when the Bourbon monarch was replaced by Napoleon Bonaparte's brother Joseph and the legitimacy of the ruler challenged in Spain and Spanish America, the Cortes of Cádiz was convened – which served as a parliamentary Regency after Ferdinand VII was deposed. Ramos Arizpe was elected as a representative to the Cortes of Cádiz, where he advocated for the rights of Americans. He established the structure for the provincial deputation, which sought home rule for provinces. The Cortes of Cádiz wrote and promulgated the Spanish Constitution of 1812, which created a constitutional monarchy, as a way to curb the power of the monarchy. When Napoleon was defeated and the Bourbon monarch Ferdinand VII returned to Spain in 1814 after having declared his allegiance to the new constitution, he abolished the constitution. He jailed a number of people involved in the constitutional process, including Ramos Arizpe, who was imprisoned until the 1820 coup against the monarch that restored the constitution. The Cortes reconvened and Ramos Arizpe was again a delegate from New Spain. He pressed for a better status for Spain's components of its overseas empire, proposing commonwealth status for them.

The insurgency for Mexican independence that began with Father Miguel Hidalgo's 1810 uprising and carried on by Father José María Morelos, and Vicente Guerrero during the 1810s was at a military stalemate with royalist forces. With the 1820 Spanish Constitution, the power of the Roman Catholic Church in Mexico was threatened. Royalist military officer Agustín de Iturbide made an alliance with Guerrero, and under the Plan of Iguala declaring Mexico's independence, which was achieved in 1821. The formation of the new Mexican state initially involved a constituent congress. Ramos Arizpe returned to Mexico in 1822, when opposition to Iturbide was coalescing. He was "instrumental in mobilizing the provinces and drafting the Plan of Casa Mata," which called for the overthrow of Iturbide.

With the ouster of Iturbide, Mexican elites created a second Constituent Congress to write a constitution. The former colony was not constituted as a sovereign state but the former colonial regional districts considered themselves the units to form a new constitution. Ramos Arizpe was chosen as the chair of the committee to write the new constitution. In less than two weeks in 1824, the committee drafted the Acta Constitutiva, which was the founding legislation. An issue was the extent to which the Mexican states had sovereignty.

When politics in Mexico post-Iturbide were coalesced around membership in different organizations, the Scottish Rite (Escocés) and the York Rite (yorkino), Ramos Arizpe became affiliated with the York Rite Masons, who were less selective than the Escocés and had a populist following. The Yorkinos were encouraged by the first U.S. ambassador to Mexico, Joel Roberts Poinsett and he has been blamed for much political strife in the early post-independence period with his meddling. Ramos Arizpe resigned from the Yorkinos in 1826 split with his fellow Masons in 1826, earning himself enemies for his defection.

He served as justice minister for Presidents Guadalupe Victoria, Manuel Gómez Pedraza, Valentín Gómez Farías and for Antonio López de Santa Anna.

The city of Ramos Arizpe in Coahuila is named after him.

In 2004 Clio TV showed a documentary El país roto, Las guerras de Miguel Ramos Arizpe that was directed by Antonino Isordia.
