= 1828 Mexican general election =

Federal elections were held in Mexico on 1 September 1828. The president was indirectly elected by state legislatures, with winner of the presidential election serving a four-year term, while the runner-up would become vice president.

Manuel Gómez Pedraza was elected president. However, two weeks later Antonio López de Santa Anna rose in rebellion against the election and at the end of November the rebels entered Mexico City. Gómez Pedraza abandoned his position and left the country. The Congress of the Union, pressured by the adherents of Guerrero, annulled the elections on 12 January and designated Vicente Guerrero as President and Anastasio Bustamante as vice president, with their terms to start on 1 April 1829. This arrangement proved unsustainable and on 4 December 1829 Bustamante rebelled against Guerrero, taking the presidency from 1 January 1830. A further rebellion in 1832 led to an agreement by which Gómez Pedraza would return to the presidency until the elections of 1833 which Santa Anna (more interested in the title than the position) would go on to win.

== Results ==
=== President ===
Candidate	Votes	%
Manuel Gómez Pedraza	11	30.56
Vicente Guerrero	9	25.00
Anastasio Bustamante	6	16.67
Melchor Múzquiz	2	5.56
Ignacio Rayon	2	5.56
Juan Ignacio Godoy	2	5.56
Other candidates	4	11.11
Total	36	100.00
