= Juan de Dios Cañedo =

Mexican politician

- Born: 18 January 1786
- Died: 28 March 1850 (aged 64)
- Occupation: Politician

Juan de Dios Cañedo (born in Guadalajara, 18 January 1786; died in Mexico City, 28 March 1850) was a Mexican statesman.

== Biography ==
He received a good education and was admitted to the bar in 1809. He was elected a deputy to the Spanish Cortes in 1813, and soon became prominent as a parliamentary orator. While in Madrid, he published a manifesto to the Spanish nation in defence of the colonial interests, which was eagerly read both in Spain and her American possessions.

On his return to Mexico in 1824, Cañedo took part in the debate relative to the new republican constitution. He was several times deputy and senator, minister of foreign affairs under Victoria's administration, represented his country as plenipotentiary in Brazil, Peru, and Chile, and was in charge of the foreign office and the department of the interior under Bustamante. Afterward he went to Europe, where he resided for some years, and had just returned to Mexico when he was killed by an unknown assassin.
