= Manuel de Mier y Terán =

Mexican General (1789–1832)

Manuel Mier y Terán
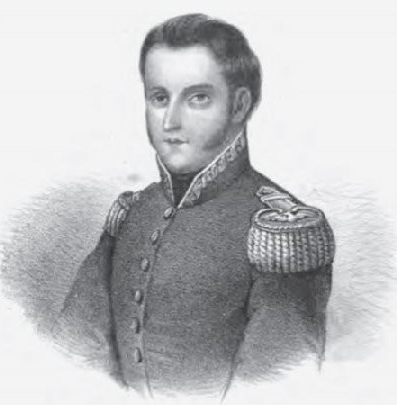

6th Minister of War and Marine
- In office 12 March 1824 – 18 December 1824
- President: Guadalupe Victoria (since 10 October 1824)
- Preceded by: José Joaquín de Herrera
- Succeeded by: José Castro

Personal details
- Born: February 18, 1789 Mexico City, Viceroyalty of New Spain
- Died: July 3, 1832 (aged 43) Padilla, Tamaulipas, Mexico

Military service
- Allegiance: Mexican insurgents First Mexican Empire First Mexican Republic
- Branch/service: Mexican Army
- Years of service: 1811—1832
- Rank: Brigadier General
- Battles/wars: Mexican War of Independence: Battle of Tehuacán; Barradas Expedition: Battle of Pueblo Viejo

José Manuel Rafael Simeón de Mier y Terán (February 18, 1789 — July 3, 1832), generally known as Manuel de Mier y Terán, was a military and political figure during the Mexican War of Independence and during the era of the First Republic serving in the Mexican congress and as Minister of War. He made an inspection of Texas on behalf of the government and was placed in charge of securing the area after the Mexican government banned further American immigration in 1830.

He was at one point considered a potential candidate for the Mexican presidency. However, health problems and despair over the nation's political situation drove him to commit suicide in 1832 during a revolution against the government of Anastasio Bustamante.

== Early career ==
Mier y Terán studied at Mexico City's School of Mines before the outbreak of the insurgency for independence in 1810. He joined the insurgents in 1812 and rose to a leadership position. He was one of the few American-born Spaniards to fight on the side of the insurgency, serving under José María Morelos until Morelos's death in 1815. Following independence, he was elected to the First Mexican Congress as the representative for Chiapas and served on its committee for the colonization of unoccupied territory. Two years later, he made brigadier general and served as Minister of War under President Guadalupe Victoria, although he resigned within nine months over differences with the administration. He served with Antonio López de Santa Anna in repelling the Spanish reconquest of Mexico in 1829.

He then served as State Inspector at Veracruz, part of a Mexican mission to England, and director of the Mexican School of Artillery until 1827. The same year, he went to Tamaulipas and Texas.

== Inspection of Texas ==
After gaining the rank of general, Terán headed an expedition to inspect Texas. His main charges were to inspect the boundary between Texas and the United States, make a record of natural resources, and evaluate a policy of preference for European settlement of Texas.

Terán assembled a team of scientists and military advisors and led them first to Laredo in 1828. He recorded a narrative of this trip in his diary, while two members of his expedition—José María de Sánchez y Tapia and Jean Louis Berlandier—maintained their own diaries. They continued and made stops in San Antonio, San Felipe and Gonzales. While they attempted to continue their journey to Nacogdoches, however, illnesses and broken equipment plagued the expedition as they struggled to pull their wagons over poor roads. When they reached the Trinity River, selected just eight men to cross the river with their horses. He sent the rest of the men back with all the wagons and most of the equipment.

== Commandant ==
After returning to Mexico, General Terán served as second in command to Santa Anna during his defense of Tampico against the Spanish invasion of 1829. He participated in the Capitulation of Pueblo Viejo. Their success made them both national heroes. Considered a strong candidate for president, he lost his chance when Santa Anna and Zavala's coup d'etat briefly gave the position to Vicente Guerrero. The next year, another coup elevated Anastasio Bustamante, who named Mier y Terán as his commandant general for the northeastern provinces, giving Terán military and civil authority over the provinces of Coahuila y Tejas, Nuevo León, and Tamaulipas.

Headquartered at the recently renamed city of Matamoros, he arrived in Galveston Bay in November 1831, to review the port of Anahuac and install the Serb George Fisher as its new customs agent. Texian scofflaws had been smuggling and evading taxes, so he granted Fisher authority over the mouth of the Brazos River, as well. The general instructed John Bradburn to enforce title fees and remove an unauthorized ayuntamiento installed at Liberty. These administrative changes led directly to the Anahuac Disturbances, an uprising that was a precursor to the 1836 Texas Revolution.

In 1832, during the uprising against president Anastasio Bustamante known as Plan of Veracruz Mier y Teran attempted to suppress the rebels only to be routed by the forces of Esteban Moctezuma. This made Teran increasingly desolate over the future of the nation. He was one of the creole elites who felt that they had failed in the post-independence period to forge a nation. As commander in Texas, he saw the northern region slipping away to the Anglo-Americans, and he became increasingly worried about another Spanish attempt to reconquer Mexico. He wrote, "I believe that the Spaniards can only cause us temporary damages; the serious and permanent ones are reserved for our own hands, and those of the North American neighbors." He also wrote Lucas Alamán the day before he ended his life, asking how Mexico could hold Texas if they could not stop killing each other. In despair, on July 3, he committed a highly symbolic suicide by throwing himself on his sword in Padilla, Tamaulipas. It was the same location where Emperor Agustín de Iturbide had been executed in 1824, following his return from exile by the men of General Felipe de la Garza Cisneros. Mier y Terán's remains were buried with Iturbide's as were his wishes. In 1838, when the emperor's bones were re-interred in Mexico City.

== Family ==
General Terán was the youngest of the three sons of Manuel de Mier y Terán and his wife María Ignacia de Teruel y Llanos.

== Legacy ==
The city of General Terán in Nuevo León, Mexico, is named in his honor. Ciudad Mier, Tamaulipas, however, was named after Francisco Mier y Torre, the governor of Nuevo León from 1710 to 1714.

He was also the namesake of Fort Terán on the Neches River in modern Tyler County, Texas.

== See also ==
- Fort Tenoxtitlán, established 1813

== External sources ==
- Margaret Swett Henson: Manuel de Mier y Terán from the Handbook of Texas Online. Retrieved 3 February 2010.
- McKeehan, Wallace. Manuel de Mier y Terán 1789-1832. Sons of DeWitt Colony, Texas, Website.
