= Manuel Gómez Pedraza =

President of Mexico from 1832 to 1833

The Most Excellent Manuel Gómez Pedraza y Rodríguez
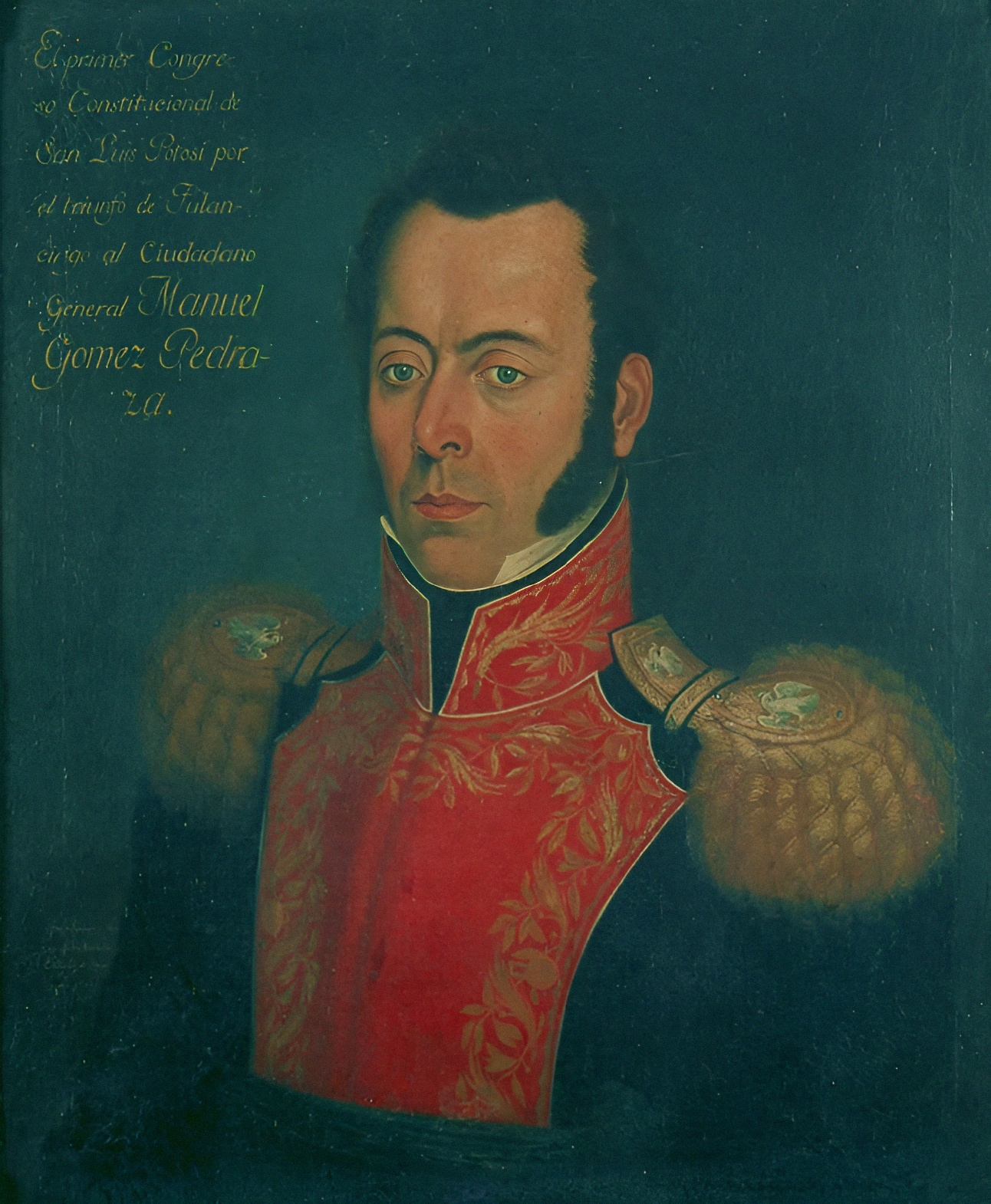
- Portrait of Pedraza, 1828

6th President of Mexico
- In office 24 December 1832 – 31 March 1833
- Preceded by: Melchor Múzquiz
- Succeeded by: Valentín Gómez Farías

8th Minister of War and Marine
- In office 8 January 1825 – 7 June 1825
- President: Guadalupe Victoria
- Preceded by: José Castro
- Succeeded by: José Ignacio Esteva
- In office 15 July 1825 – 9 February 1827
- President: Guadalupe Victoria
- Preceded by: José Ignacio Esteva
- Succeeded by: Manuel Rincón
- In office 4 March – 3 December 1827
- President: Guadalupe Victoria
- Preceded by: Manuel Rincón
- Succeeded by: José Castro

Personal details
- Born: 22 April 1789 Santiago de Querétaro, Querétaro, New Spain
- Died: 14 May 1851 (aged 62) Mexico City
- Resting place: Panteón Francés
- Party: Moderate

Manuel Gómez Pedraza y Rodríguez (22 April 1789 – 14 May 1851) was a Mexican general who also became president of Mexico during the First Mexican Republic.

He had initially won the election of 1828, which was disputed and led to riots at the capital, causing Gómez Pedraza to flee the country. He was eventually elevated to the presidency through a rebellion against president Anastasio Bustamante in 1832.

== Early life ==
Manuel Gomez Pedraza was born in Querétaro and was an official in charge of militias during Spanish rule. He was known for being very strict in following discipline and orders. During the war he was initially a royalist, and played a role in the defeat of the leading rebel José María Morelos, while fighting at the head of the Fieles de Potosí Battalion. Pedraza was loyal to Spain up until the very end of the war, being viewed as a very reliable by the hierarchy, and being recommended to the Spanish Cortes as meriting a promotion. He was a passionate supporter of the First Mexican Empire, and he was stationed in Mexico City during the empire's last days.

== Governor of Puebla ==
Under the First Mexican Republic, he was governor and commandant general of the State of Puebla in 1824, where he was accused of not being harsh enough during political insurrections, and of not having provided protection to several foreigners who were robbed. He survived these charges, and was called upon by President Guadalupe Victoria to take be the Minister of War when Manuel de Mier y Terán stepped down.

In this time of fierce partisan strife, between the liberal Yorkino Party and the conservative Escoses Party Gomez Pedraza belonged to the latter, but to a moderate branch of 'imparciales' which was made up of men loyal to the federal form of government, and which included both Yorkinos and Escoseses, and who launched Pedraza to the candidacy for the 1828 Presidential elections.

== Election of 1828 ==
The presidential elections at this time were decided by the state legislatures. Gomez Pedraza would be elected as the winner, defeating the rival candidate Vicente Guerrero, but Guerrero's partisans alleged that Pedraza as minister of war used his influence to send military agents throughout the states to influence the election in his favor.

Yorkino revolts against the results broke out at Veracruz in September 1828, and at Mexico City, and they were significant enough to cause Gómez Pedraza to question the loyalty of the army. Gómez Pedraza vacillated as the revolutionaries made more gains, and he eventually decided to concede, resigning the ministry and leaving the country for France after which congress recognized the events and declared Guerrero president and Anastasio Bustamante vice president.

Two years later Gómez Pedraza returned from Bordeaux in October 1830, but the government of Anastasio Bustamante did not allow him to enter the country and he disembarked and headed for the United States, eventually settling in Pennsylvania. Here, he published a summary of his public life, attacking the government of Bustamante. Deputy Andrés Quintana Roo condemned the government for not allowing Gómez Pedraza back into the country without due cause.

== Plan of Veracruz ==
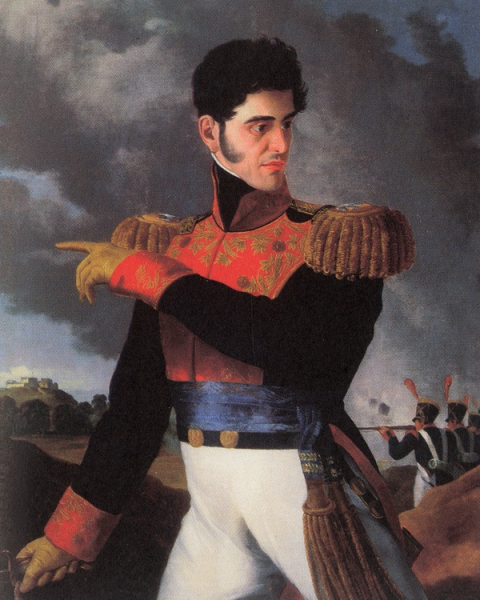
Santa Anna (pictured) led the revolt against President Anastasio Bustamante in 1832 which paved the way for Manuel Gómez Pedraza to reach the presidency

After the overthrow of Bustamante in 1832 through the Plan of Veracruz, the revolutionists resolved on inviting Gómez Pedraza back into the country to serve out the remaining months of the term he was first elected to in 1828. A commissioner was sent to go to the United States to convince Gómez Pedraza to return, but he initially declined. He was eventually convinced by the commissioners who argued that he could unite a nation that was relapsing into civil war. Gómez Pedraza arrived in Veracruz at the beginning of November.

He met with the leading rebel Santa Anna who assured Gómez Pedraza that this revolution had a popular character which the previous ones had lacked, that among his supporters were prominent men of all views, and free from partisan spirit. He described the pointless struggle that the two parties had engaged in now for six years and violently fought over for four, assuring Gómez Pedraza that he was free from being the tool of either. Gómez Pedraza noted how difficult it was going to be to assume the presidency and expressed hopes to reform the constitution, guarantee the people free elections, social rights, the right of petition, and to reorganize the military. He laid out a program expressing that the national will shall only be that which is expressed by means and manners laid out in the constitution and in the laws, and that all pronunciamientos made against the national will thus defined, shall be punished with the utmost severity of the law.

== Presidency ==
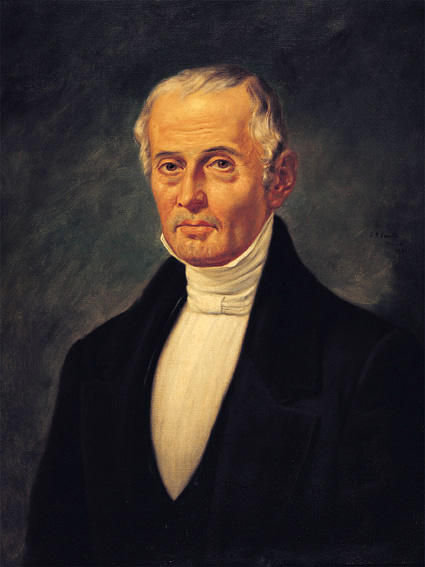
Towards the end of his term, Pedraza endorsed the Liberal candidate Valentín Gómez Farías (pictured) who would go on to win the election of 1833.

President Anastasio Bustamante officially stepped down on December 24, 1832 through the Treaty of Zavaleta, and power passed to Gómez Pedraza. Santa Anna and Gómez Pedraza entered the capital on January 3, 1833 amidst public clamor and celebration. In one carriage was a painting portraying the Battle of Tampico, and an allegory of the Mexican nation was portrayed by a dressed up young girl, carrying on her right hand the portrait of Santa Anna. Another carriage had a young woman carrying a copy of the constitution.

Upon assuming the presidency Gómez Pedraza passed a decree expelling the Spaniards who had returned during the presidency of Bustamante. Lists of Spaniards in the cities were compiled, and a few exceptions were made such as for those Spaniards who had not taken active part in supporting Spain during the War of Independence. Vindictive measures were also taken against officials who had been a part of the Bustamante administration.

As the constitution forbade presidents from being re-elected, Gómez Pedraza was not qualified to run in the elections of 1833, and he instead endorsed Santa Anna and Valentín Gómez Farías who eventually would be elected president and vice president respectively.

He dissolved a large portion of the armed forces that had brought him to power and urged the legislatures to pass severe measures against the armed bands of outlaws that were interfering with commerce, travel, and agriculture. He handed power over to Gómez Farías on April 1, as president-elect Santa Anna was not in the capital at the time.

== Later political career ==
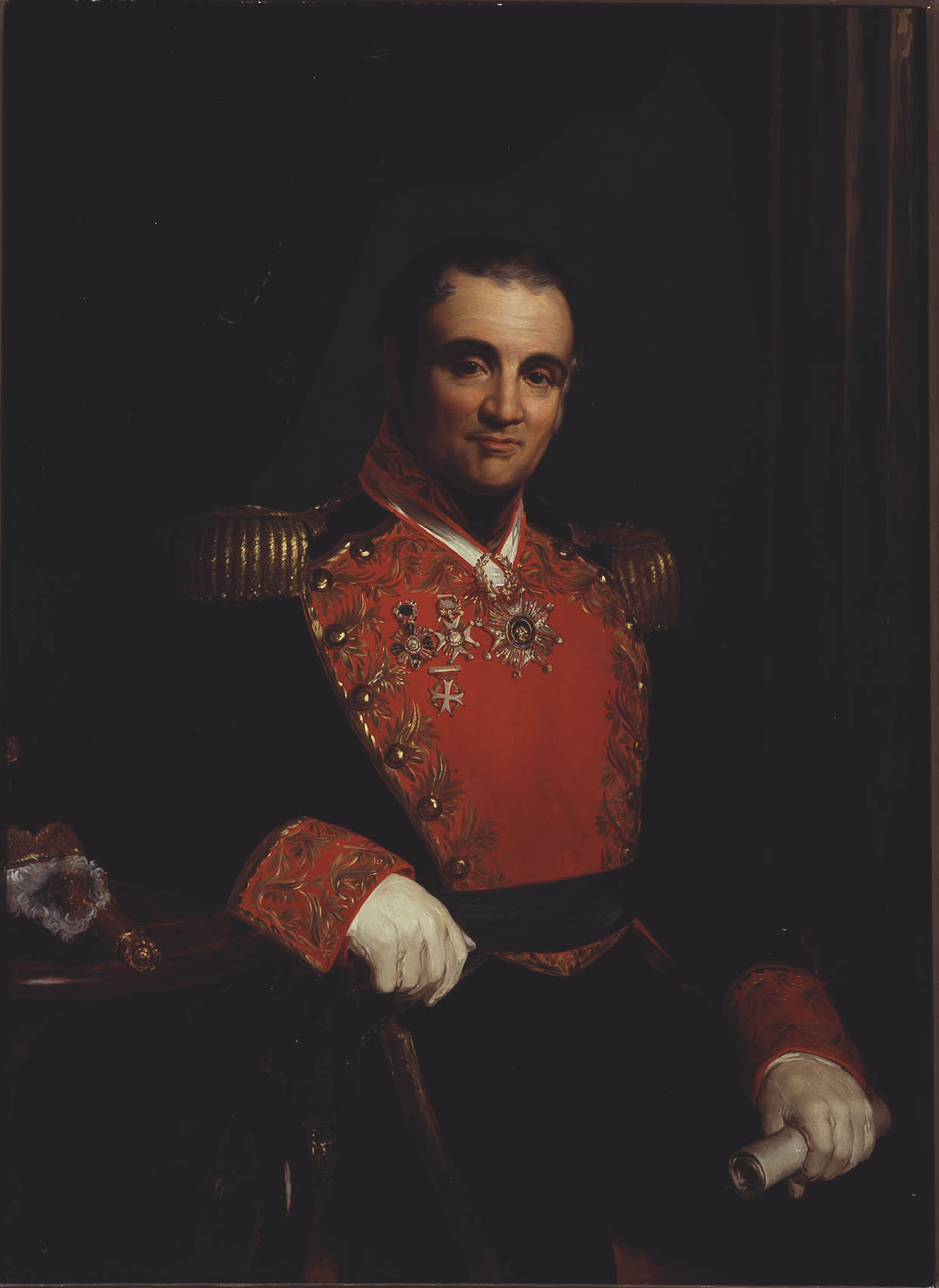
As a known moderate, Pedraza would be invited to serve in the cabinet of the Conservative president Anastasio Bustamante (pictured) in 1838.

After he stepped down he continued to be a member of the liberal federalist party, but Gómez Pedraza and his colleague Rodriguez Puebla were among those liberals who opposed President Gómez Farías' efforts to assimilate Mexico's Indigenous Communities. When Anastasio Bustamante returned to the presidency under the Centralist Republic of Mexico, he at one point pursued a moderate course to the point where Gomez Pedraza ended up as one of his ministers in December 1838, but Gómez Pedraza resigned after only three days due to disagreements. He was however able to serve as Minister of Relations under Santa Anna in 1841, during a time when federalists hoped that the newly elected constitutional congress would reestablish the federalist constitution. Gómez Pedraza would actually be a part of that congress until it was dissolved by President Nicolás Bravo.

After the fall of Santa Anna in 1844, Gómez Pedraza was a member of the grand jury charged with trying Santa Anna after his capture, but the dictator was amnestied. Later as part of the senate he helped pursue President José Joaquín de Herrera's aim of seeking a diplomatic solution to the Texas problem, hoping to recognize its independence, while gaining concessions that would allow Mexico an honorable end to the decade long conflict, but this was interrupted by a coup led by Mariano Paredes who was part of a faction of hardliners who preferred war.

During the subsequent Mexican-American War he was a part of the council of state, and he tried to restrain President Valentín Gómez Farías' efforts to nationalize church lands in the middle of the war. At the end of the war, as the Mexican government was based in Queretaro, Gómez Pedraza took part in the confidential consultory commissions, established by president Pedro María de Anaya. Gómez Pedraza himself belonging to the commission of foreign relations.

After the treaty of peace was established he returned to the capital and was a candidate for the presidential elections of 1850 but lost to Mariano Arista. The government of President José Joaquín de Herrera commissioned him to conclude a treaty with Robert P. Letcher regarding communications across the Isthmus of Tehuantepec.

== Final years ==
Shortly after he fell gravely ill with tuberculosis. He maintained lucidity on his deathbed and arranged his public affairs. He also asked not to receive a funeral. He died on May 14, 1851.

== See also ==
- List of heads of state of Mexico

Political offices
Preceded by Melchor Múzquiz	President of Mexico; 24 December 1832 – 31 March 1833	Succeeded by Valentín Gómez Farías
