= Plan of Veracruz (1832) =

1832 call to revolt against Mexican president Anastasio Bustamante

Major battles overlaid on a map of modern day Mexico.
= government victory
= insurgent victory.

In the history of Mexico, the Plan of Veracruz was a proclamation released on January 2, 1832, by the military garrison of Veracruz. The initial goal was simply to remove unpopular ministers from the cabinet of President Anastasio Bustamante, but later expanded into a year-long civil war within the First Mexican Republic that ended with the ousting of Bustamente and the recognition of Manuel Gómez Pedraza as president.

== Historical context ==
Upon the achievement of independence in 1821, Mexican politics, had been largely divided between those seeking a federal government, and those seeking a more centralist government. The Constitution of 1824 arranged the national government upon federal lines, while the debate over federalism and centralism continued.

President Bustamante himself had gained power in a military coup in 1830 against his immediate predecessor Vicente Guerrero, who, in turn, had gained power in a coup against president-elect Gomez Pedraza in 1828.

Once in power, the Bustamante administration began to pursue conservative, autocratic, and centralist policies orchestrated primarily by Minister of Interior and Exterior Relations Lucas Alaman. The legislative and the judiciary showed themselves to be subservient to the executive. War Minister Jose Antonio Facio administered an unpopular military rule. Offended by the manner that the military was ruling over their state capital, the legislature of Jalisco moved itself temporarily from Guadalajara to Lagos.

== Declaration ==
Officers of the Veracruz garrison and the San Juan de Ulua fortress complex gathered at the home of Colonel Pedro Landero, where they agreed to the following:

1. The garrison expresses support for the Federal Constitution of 1824, against the centralist government of Bustamante.
2. It is requested that the federal cabinet be dismissed due to autocratic abuses.
3. General Antonio López de Santa Anna is invited to command the Veracruz Garrison.
4. In the event of Santa Anna's acceptance, all power of negotiating with the federal government is handed over to him.

Santa Anna, accepted the requests and began communications with Bustamante. He proposed, more liberal cabinet members. The press severely criticized Santa Anna, comparing him to the Roman politician Catiline. Bustamante negotiated with Santa Anna, buying time to delay a civil war while ordering Facio to move a contingent of 4,000 men to Xalapa to halt the rebel advance.

On February 24, the rebels seized a convoy with ammunition, money and supplies near the National Bridge. They were defeated on March 3 by the forces of general Jose Maria Calderon and Jose Antonio Facio. Santa Anna escaped to Veracruz' Fort San Juan de Ulua; his strategy worked until mid-May, when Calderon lifted the siege of Veracruz because his army was decimated by rain, heat, mosquitoes and disease.

== Reaction and aftermath ==
Although the plan was initially opposed by the garrisons of Toluca, Tejupilco, Puebla, Guanajuato, Querétaro, Michoacán, Tlaxcala, Jalisco, Acapulco, Oaxaca and Aguascalientes, the garrisons' support gradually grew. On March 10, the garrison of Pueblo Viejo supported the plan and imprisoned commander Ignacio Mora. On the 19th, General Jose Esteban Moctezuma (who had been sent to pacify Tamaulipas) joined the plan. General Manuel Mier y Teran and San Luis Potosí governor Zenon Fernandez began preparing troops to face Moctezuma after engaging in dialogue with the rebels.

The state governments of Zacatecas and Jalisco decided to join the Plan of Veracruz, with the options to summon Manuel Gómez Pedraza for the presidency and reverse unconstitutional acts. Farias and Garcia Salinas convinced General Ignacio Inclan to act in Lerma, but his movement was suppressed by Mariano Arista. On May 17, the ministers (except for Finance Minister Mangino) resigned; the press and public opinion felt that this was a political maneuver, since it was believed that former ministers could continue to exercise their duties.

General Mariano Martinez de Lejarza took up arms in Tabasco in support of the plan in June, commanding the state capital and repelling an attack by the bustamantista governors of Yucatán and Chiapas. On June 12, shortly before a confrontation between Santa Anna and Calderon's forces, a cease-fire was brokered in Corral Falso by Juan Francisco Bautista Caraza. Government forces returned to Encero and rebel forces to Paso de Ovejas, with the National Bridge neutral territory.

The government appointed Sebastian Camacho and Guadalupe Victoria as mediators. Manuel Mier y Teran faced Texas settlers who supported the Plan of Veracruz and tried to extend the armistice with Esteban Moctezuma, but the latter refused. Mier y Teran, considered a strong candidate for the presidency, committed suicide on July 3. Six days later, Colonel Antonio Barragan joined the uprising in Valle del Maiz. With negotiations at the National Bridge at an impasse, Moctezuma defeated government forces at Carmelos Well in San Luis Potosí (where General Pedro Otero died). Governor Zenon Fernandez was forced to flee to Querétaro.

On August 6, Bustamante asked Congress for command of the army to confront the rebellion. The following day, Melchor Muzquiz was named interim president and formally took office on August 14. A few days later, the state of Guanajuato was declared neutral. Manuel Prieto in Morelia joined the Plan; Sebastian Camacho distanced himself from Santa Anna, declaring his loyalty to the Bustamante government. The first company of Chihuahua and the colony of Austin in Texas supported the rebellion. On August 12, General Juan Alvarez supported the plan at Fort San Diego in Acapulco.

In the Tulancingo and Zacatlán area, General Gabriel Valencia deserted Bustamante and joined the rebellion. On September 8, commander Cirilo Gomez Anaya left the capital to fight him. On September 10, Nicolas Bravo forged an armistice with Juan Alvarez on September 10, six days later the governments of Yucatán, Campeche and Tabasco delivered Zacatecas to the plan. Bustamante defeated Moctezuma in the September 18 Battle of the Roost, inflicting a total of 2,800 casualties (dead, wounded and prisoners). He sent a letter of resignation to the Chamber of Deputies the following day to end the war, and later went to San Luis Potosí.

Santa Anna defeated Jose Antonio Facio in the September 29 Battle of San Agustin del Palmar and seized weapons and ammunition. A few days later he defeated Juan José Andrade, who had tried to stop the entry of rebel forces into the capital. After Andrade's surrender, interim president Melchor Muzquiz held talks with Santa Anna to avoid war in Mexico's capital. On November 7, Gomez Pedraza arrived at the port of Veracruz to mediate. After a few skirmishes, Bustamante and Santa Anna signed an armistice on December 11 as the civil war in the rest of the country was concluding. The December 24 Zavaleta Convention established that Gomez Pedraza would be recognized as president and until April 1, 1833.

== Bibliography ==
- Eugenia, María (1987). Instituto de Cultura de Tabasco (ed.). Tabasco: Una historia compartida. México: Instituto de Investigaciones Dr. José María Luis Mora. ISBN 968-6173-11-0.
- González Pedrero, Enrique (2004). País de un solo hombre: el México de Santa Anna. Volumen II. La sociedad de fuego cruzado 1829-1836 (in Spanish). México: Fondo de Cultura Económica. ISBN 968-16-6377-2.
- Olavarría y Ferrari, Enrique de (1880). "México independiente 1821-1855". In Palacio, Vicente Riva (ed.). México a través de los siglos.
- Vicente Riva Palacio, ed. (1888). México a través de los siglos. p. 212.
- Daniel Cosío Villegas, ed. (2004). Historia general de México : versión 2000 (5a. reimpr. ed.). México: El Colegio de México. ISBN 968-12-0969-9.
