= Second Federal Republic of Mexico =

Period of Mexican history from 1846 to 1863

Coordinates: 19°26′N 99°8′W

United Mexican States Estados Unidos Mexicanos
- 1846–1863
- Flag Coat of arms
- Motto: La Patria es Primero; The Fatherland comes first
- Anthem: "Himno Nacional Mexicano" (English: "National Anthem of Mexico")
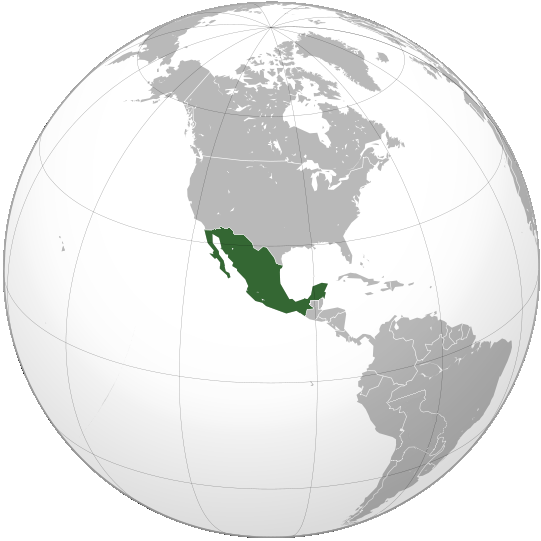
- Mexico in 1852, prior to the Gadsden Purchase, and after the Mexican Cession
- Capital: Mexico City
- Common languages: Spanish (official), Nahuatl, Yucatec Maya, Mixtecan languages, Zapotec languages
- Religion: Catholicism (official religion until 1857)
- Government: Federal presidential republic
- President
  - 1846: José Mariano Salas
  - 1846–1847: Valentín Gómez Farías
  - 1847: Antonio López de Santa Anna
  - 1847: Pedro María Anaya
  - 1847–1848: Manuel de la Peña y Peña
  - 1848–1851: José Joaquín de Herrera
  - 1851–1853: Mariano Arista
  - 1853–1855: Antonio López de Santa Anna
  - 1855: Juan Álvarez
  - 1855–1857: Ignacio Comonfort
  - 1857–1863: Benito Juárez (Juárez continues as president into the era of the Second Mexican Empire)
- History
  - 1824 Constitution restored: 22 August 1846
  - Treaty of Guadalupe Hidalgo: 2 February 1848
  - Santa Anna's last dictatorship: 1853–1855
  - Constitution of 1857 promulgated: 12 February 1857
  - Reform War: 1857–1860
  - Second French Intervention begins: 8 December 1861
  - French troops capture Mexico City: 10 June 1863
  - Assembly of Notables proclaims the Second Mexican Empire: 10 July 1863

Population
  - 1852: 7,661,919
- Currency: Mexican real
Preceded by
Centralist Republic of Mexico
Republic of Yucatán
Republic of Sonora
Succeeded by
Second Mexican Empire
Mexican Cession
Republic of Baja California
Gadsden Purchase
- Today part of: Mexico; United States

The Second Federal Republic of Mexico (Spanish: Segunda República Federal de México) refers to the period of Mexican history involving a second attempt to establish a federal government in Mexico after the fall of the unitary Centralist Republic of Mexico in 1846 at the start of the Mexican–American War. It would last up until the Second French intervention in Mexico led to the proclamation of the Second Mexican Empire in 1863.

The period of the Second Federal Republic proved to be one of the most eventful periods in Mexican history, experiencing two foreign invasions, the loss of half of the national territory, constitutional change, and a civil war. It was also a period of Mexican political evolution experiencing the downfall of the Conservative Party that had predominated during the Centralist Republic, and marking the rise of a Liberal Party hegemony which would consolidate itself throughout the rest of the century.

The Second Federal Republic was born in the first months of the Mexican-American War in 1846, with the restoration of the Constitution of 1824. The war ended in 1848 with Mexico being forced to cede half of its territory to the United States. The period immediately following the war would nonetheless be followed by a period of stable, moderate governments.

A Conservative coup then overthrew the government in 1852, bringing Santa Anna back for what would be his final dictatorship.

The Liberal revolt which in turn overthrew him in 1855, would inaugurate what would come to be known as La Reforma, a series of substantial unprecedented reforms in Mexican constitutional history, most notably the separation of church and state and the nationalization of Catholic Church lands. A new constitution implementing such measures was promulgated in 1857, upon which the Conservative Party opposition took up arms, inaugurating three years of what would come to be known as the Reform War.

The Liberal government led by president Benito Juárez would emerge triumphant in 1860, but a financial crisis led the government to postpone its external debts, a measure that was used as a pretext by the Second French Empire to launch an invasion of Mexico with the aim of turning it into a client state led by Maximilian of Habsburg. The Second French intervention in Mexico began in 1861, but was subsequently delayed by a year due to the French loss in the Battle of Puebla. French reinforcements arrived and President Benito Juárez was forced to evacuate the capital which the French occupied by June, 1863. French troops subsequently arranged a Mexican Assembly of Notables to declare the establishment of the Second Mexican Empire in July 1863, putting an end to the era of the Second Federal Republic of Mexico.

== History ==
=== Mexican American War ===
The Mexican American War broke out in April 1846 during the presidency of Mariano Paredes.

A series of uninterrupted Mexican losses inflamed opposition against the government, and Paredes faced revolution, he resigned on July 28, choosing to return to the military to help with the war effort. Nicolás Bravo was meanwhile chosen as his successor.

On August 3, the garrisons of Vera Cruz and San Juan de Ulua revolted, against Bravo. José Mariano Salas was made the provisional president, and on August 22, he restored the Constitution of 1824, putting an end to Centralist Republic of Mexico, and inaugurating the era of the Second Federalist Republic.

==== Restoration of the federal system ====
Salas allowed the exiled Santa Anna to return to the nation, and the latter embraced the liberal Constitution of 1824, thus restoring the federal system and giving birth to the era of the Second Federal Republic. Salas now formed his cabinet out of liberals and Santa Anna supporters, including ex president Valentín Gómez Farías who now received the post of finance minister.

Congress finally opened its sessions on December 5, 1846, at midnight, composed mostly of liberals. General Salas opened the session by lamenting the defeats that the military had faced, but expressed hope for the army of twenty thousand men that Santa Anna had gathered at San Luis Potosi. He expressed that he was completely behind continuing the war,. He also expounded upon the peace proposals that had been forwarded to him by the American government. In December the congress elected Santa Anna and Gomez Farias as president and vice-president respectively. Both men had previously won the elections of 1832 in the same fashion. They assumed power on the 24th.

The government struggled to finance the war, a problem made worse by the refusal of several state governments to cooperate, and by corruption in the finance ministry, which did not inspire confidence when the government proposed an audit of property owners. On January 7, 1847, a measure was introduced to congress endorsing the seizure of fifteen million pesos from the church by nationalizing and then selling its lands.

The proposal created great controversy and on February 27, 1847, several national guard battalions proclaimed against the government. They released a manifesto excoriating the government for pursuing a divisive policy instead of uniting the country in the war effort and seeking a means of funding the military that was backed by national consensus.This became known as the Revolt of the Polkos, because the young middle class men who made up the militias stations throughout the capital were known for dancing the polka.

==== American troops land at Veracruz ====
Meanwhile news arrived that Santa Anna had won the Battle of Buena Vista which took place on February 22 to February 23, 1847, and which in reality had been a draw. Santa was heading back to Mexico City to arrange defenses against the forces of Winfield Scott who had just landed at Veracruz. He was at the town of Matehuala on the way from Angostura to San Luis Potosí City, when he received news that there had been a revolution against the government of Valentin Gomez Farias.Valentin Gomez Farias resigned. The insurrection ended, troops were sent back to their stations, and the presidency passed over to Santa Anna, but in turn Santa Anna passed the presidency over to Pedro María de Anaya, as he went to face the forces of Winfield Scott.

Anaya was authorized by congress to place the capital under a state of siege. After the Battle of Cerro Gordo in which the Americans broke through the defenses on the way to Mexico City, congress gave the president extraordinary faculties, without giving him the authority to sign a peace treaty on his own, or to alienate any portion of national territory, and anyone who now attempted to negotiate with the Americans was declared a traitor. On April 2, 1847, Anaya convoked a junta in which he to resolve the issue on whether to defend the capital in case there was not a reasonable chance of winning. All of the supply and budget issues were expounded and the cabinet endorsed guerrilla warfare. When Santa Anna returned to the capital, Anaya passed the presidency down to him.

==== Battle for Mexico City ====
Santa Anna was in charge of the presidency as the Americans advanced upon and eventually captured Mexico City. The presidency was eventually transferred back to Anaya, who had commanded forces in the defense of Mexico City. After the loss of the capital the Mexican government fled northeast to the city of Querétaro City. Various governors gathered at Queretaro and suggested various options to the government ranging from a continuation of the war to the surrender of the sparsely populated northern territories. Per the instructions of Congress, Anaya's term ended on January 8, 1847, and the presidency passed to Manuel de la Peña y Peña, who had already served a brief term during the war.

==== Treaty of Guadalupe Hidalgo ====
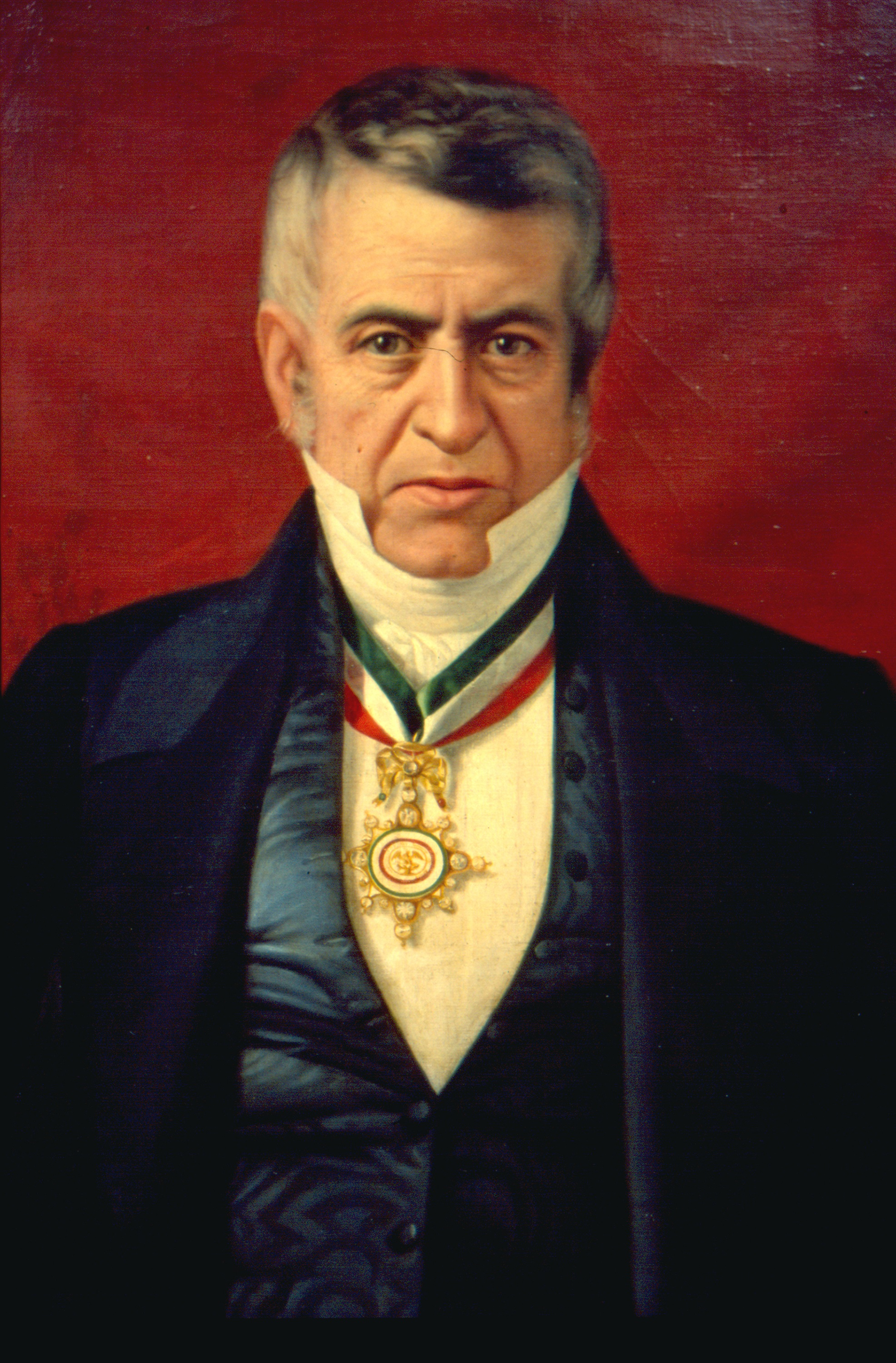
President Manuel de la Peña y Peña

Congress finally met in May, 1847 and at its opening session President Peña y Peña recommended a policy of peace, and recounted the progress that had been made in the fields of order and finances amidst so many challenges. He explained how as Minister of Foreign Relations under President Herrera, he had been against the war. He did not view this stance as dishonorable as even the most martial of nations at one point had faced a war they could not win. He expressed belief that Mexico simply did not have the ability to continue the war, and proclaimed that anyone who viewed such a stance as dishonorable was not worthy of being called honest.

Negotiations were opened with the United States government, and after deliberating upon the matter, the Treaty of Guadalupe Hidalgo was approved by congress.

As the peace treaty was concluded and the occupiers were on the point of leaving the country, congress named Jose Joaquin Herrera to the presidency of the republic, and Peña y Peña left his post as president in exchange for the presidency of the Supreme Court on June 3, 1848. The government left Queretaro and returned to the capital.

=== Herrera presidency ===
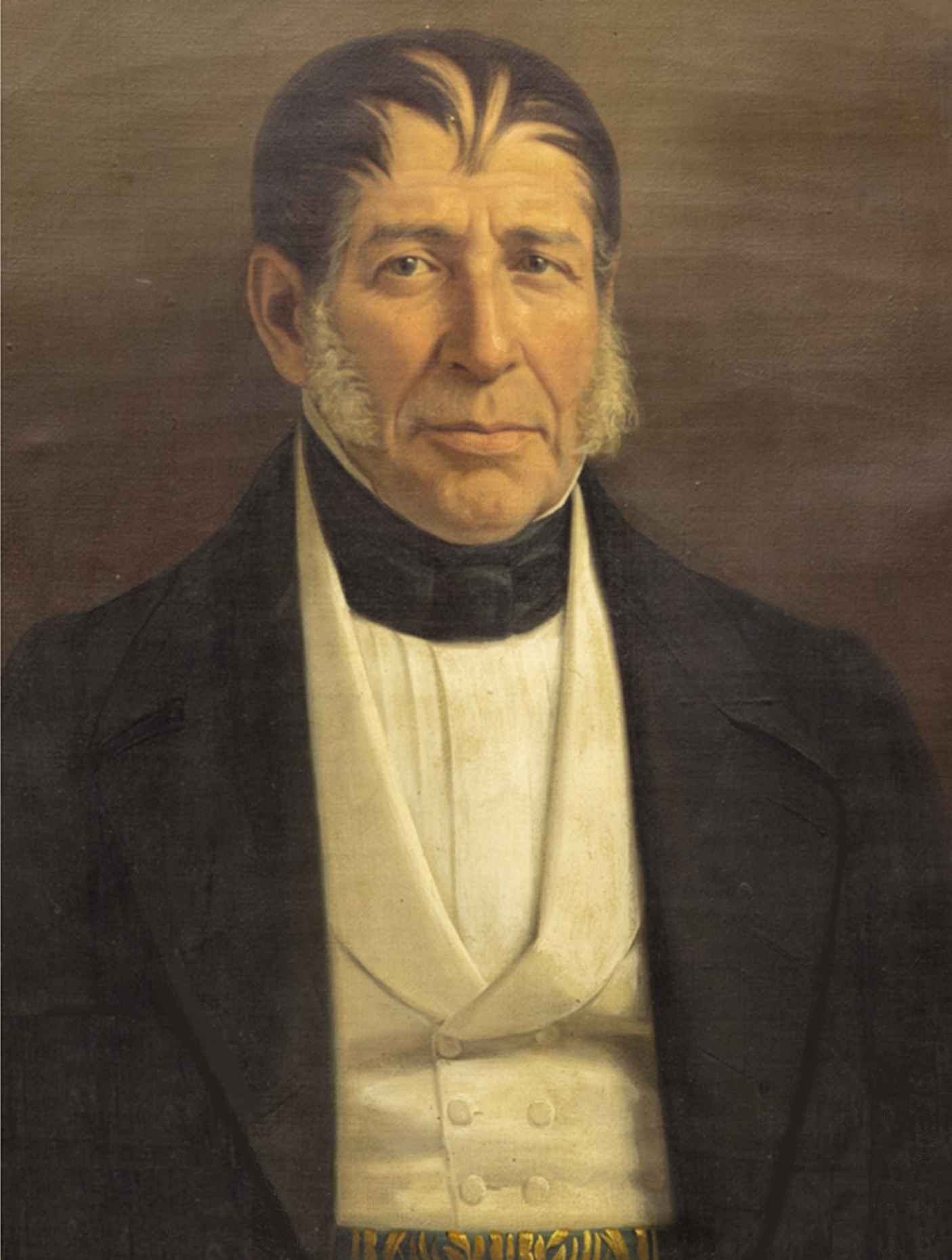
President José Joaquín de Herrera

The Herrera Administration faced enormous financial challenges and while the rest of the Herrera ministry was stable, many financial ministers resigned. However, the economy seemed to be overall improving. Abundant harvests were reported, and the mines began to increase their yields. Construction on a railway and telegraph line was begun, and the first industrial exhibition in Mexico opened on November 1, 1849, in Mexico City.

On November 4, 1848, the army was reduced to 10,000 men, and conscription was abolished, yet the latter measure had to be abrogated when only enough volunteers could be found to fill half of the men needed in the army.

The government attempted to establish military colonies along the frontier to settle and pacify the region against Indian raids. The project was hampered by lack of funds, but by 1851, despite not being as extensive as originally planned, reasonable progress on the colonies had nonetheless been made, and three successful settlements were home to over two thousand individuals.

The 1851 election was won by Mariano Arista, Herrera's Minister of War, and Herrera was the first Mexican president to complete a full term since the inaugural holder of the office, Guadalupe Victoria had passed power over to Vicente Guerrero in 1828.

=== Arista presidency ===
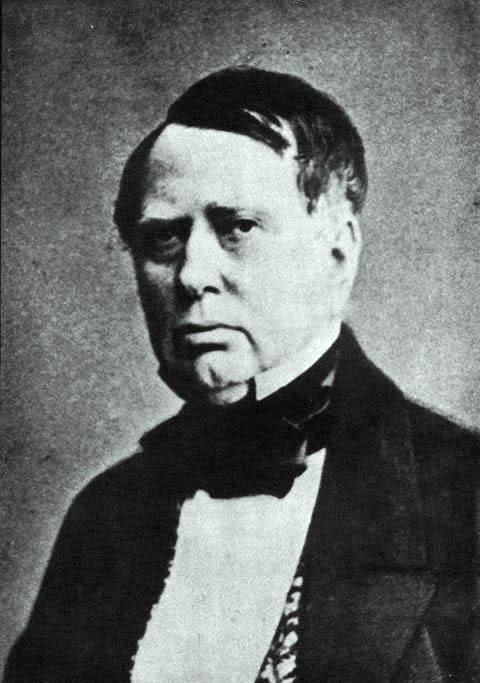
President Mariano Arista

Arista took office on January 15, 1851. He decided to adopt many of Herrera's policies, which he as Minister of War had already played a significant hand in enacting, but made some changes in the cabinet.

It was ultimately the ongoing financial crisis which would lead to Arista's fall being used as a pretext by Conservatives who wished to see Santa Anna restored to the presidency. Revolts were raised against the government, most prominent of which was the local insurrection led by a Guadalajara hatmaker named Blancarte. Supporters of Santa Anna, reached out to Blancarte and successfully convinced the latter to increase the scope of his revolt. On September 13, Blancarte proclaimed that Arista ought to be overthrown and that Santa Anna ought to be recalled to take a role in reorganizing the government.

As the Blancarte revolt spread throughout the entire nation, Arista addressed the chambers on December 15, 1852, and eventually resigned on January 5

=== Santa Anna's last dictatorship ===
The restoration of Santa Anna was brought about by a Conservative Party faction led by Lucas Alaman, and including Governor Mugica of Puebla, Teodosio Lares, and Jose Maria Tornel.

The centralist system under which the country had been governed was restored, and state legislatures among other bodies of local government were dissolved throughout the country. Education and the accreditation of lawyers was brought directly under the control of Mexico City. A new Ministry of Development was established with the responsibility of handling public works, trade, and colonization.

The military was reorganized, being increased in its number of troops, the state militias being dissolved and absorbed into the national army, and subject to an unprecedented conscription, which proved to be enormously unpopular.Santa Anna nonetheless aimed to modernize the army, hiring instructors from Europe, and improving fortresses armaments, and the ships of the Mexican Navy. The regime found new funds through the Gadsden Purchase, which nonetheless proved to be controversial for once again alienating national territory to the United States.

The dictatorship began to take on a regal atmosphere as Santa Anna moved his residence to Tacubaya to live in a lavishly decorated palace which also frequently hosted balls and soirees. He revived the noble Order of Guadalupe that had briefly existed during the First Mexican Empire, but upon the first public exposition of its members wearing their ceremonial decorations, they became subject to public ridicule throughout the country and were referred to by the pejorative 'huehuenches.' Notwithstanding, Santa Anna himself began to go under the honorific His Most Serene Highness He impeded efforts to organize a congress for the purpose of drafting a new constitution and on December 16, 1853, passed a decree extending his personal dictatorship indefinitely.

=== La Reforma ===
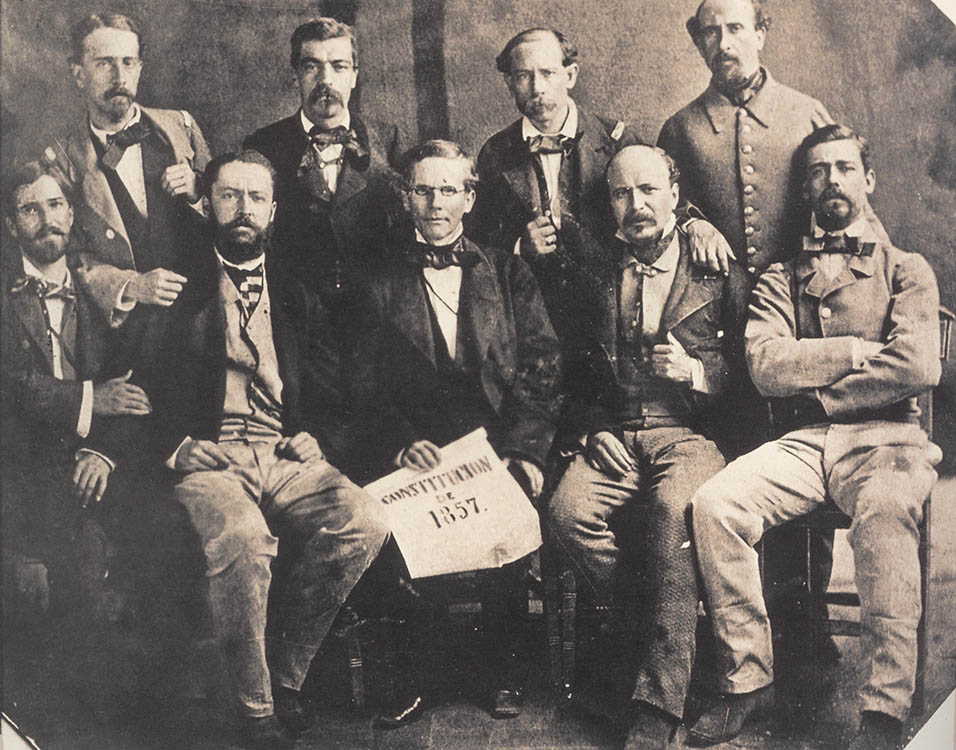
Liberals posing with a copy of the Constitution of 1857.

On March 1, 1854, the liberal Plan of Ayutla was proclaimed against Antonio Lopez de Santa Anna, indicting him for the Gadsden Purchase and his suppression of democratic government.

A little over a year of civil war followed, the Liberals being led by Juan Álvarez and Ignacio Comonfort and achieving success by October 1855. Álvarez assumed the interim presidency and convoked congress. Appointed to the Alvarez Cabinet were a younger generation of liberals that were to play a notable role in the subsequent Reforma, including the liberal lawyers Melchor Ocampo and Benito Juarez, the poet Guillermo Prieto and the anti-clerical writer Ignacio Comonfort.

The Alvarez administration made progress on some anti-clerical legislation, but amidst the controversy that was resulting he stepped down from the presidency in December 1855, passing down his office to the more moderate Comonfort.

Congress began to meet in February 1856, ratifying Comonfort's ascension to the presidency and beginning work on a new constitution. Work on the new constitution ended about a year later in February 1857, and the Constitution of 1857 was promulgated on February 12, 1857, with the purpose of coming into effect on September 16 of that year. The Constitution had integrated two major pieces of anti-clerical legislature that had been passed since the ascension of Alvarez the Ley Juarez and the Ley Lerdo, the latter nationalizing collectively owned land, a measure aimed at the Catholic Church vast holdings, but also affecting Mexico's indigenous communities.

=== Reform War ===
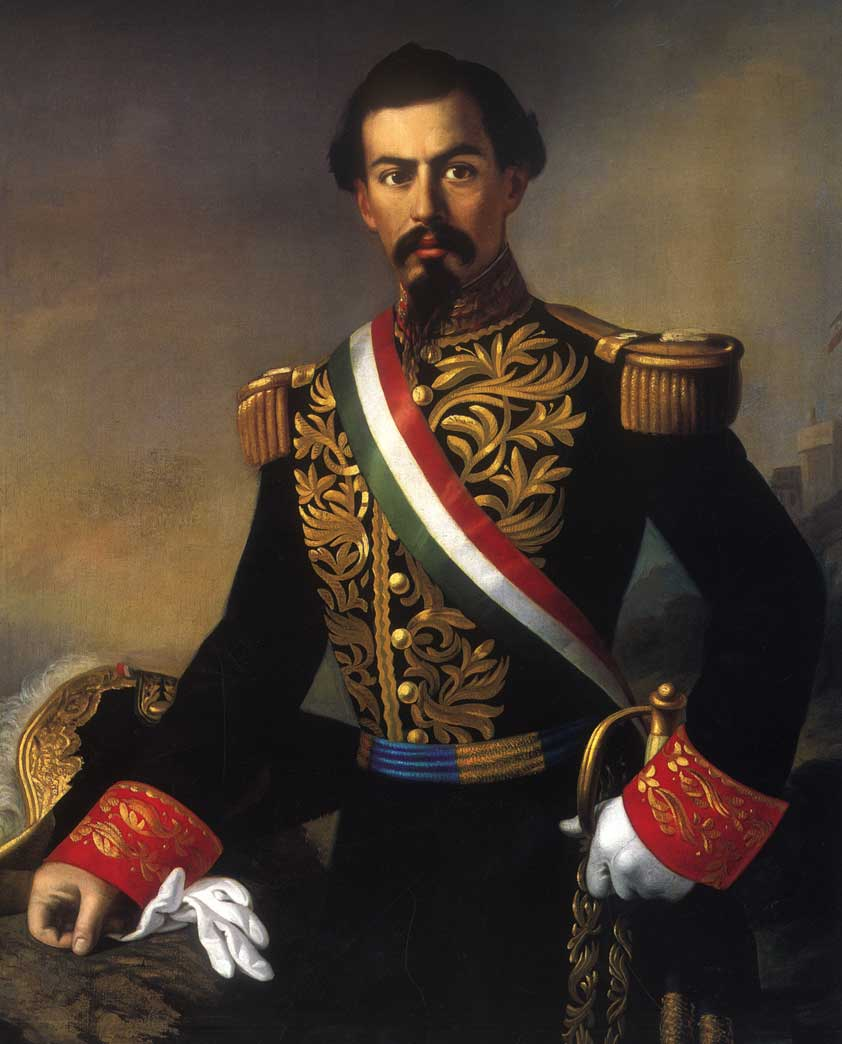
Conservative President Miguel Miramon

President Comonfort was dismayed by the level of opposition being shown towards the Constitution of 1857, also finding himself unsatisfied with how weak it left the president in the face of so many revolts. Conservatives reached out to Comonfort to overthrow the government and establish a new constitution, and On December 17, 1857 General Félix Zuloaga proclaimed the Plan of Tacubaya, declaring the Constitution of 1857 nullified, inviting Comonfort to join. To the dismay of liberals Comonfort accepted a role in to what amounted to a self coup. Comonfort accepted the Plan of Tacubaya, and released a manifesto making the case that more moderate reforms were needed under the current circumstances.

Comonfort had overestimated the support he could expect among the state governors, and upon realizing that the nation had begun to fracture into a civil war he resigned in favor of the imprisoned President of the Supreme Court Benito Juarez whom Comonfort released before leaving the nation. Juarez narrowly escaped death but eventually found himself along with the Liberal cabinet ensconced in the strategic port of Veracruz while the Conservative government remained based in Mexico City.

The initial phase of the war resulted in repeated Conservative victories, but the Liberals remained entrenched in the peripheries of the nation, and controlled strategic ports that kept them supplied with vital customs revenues. The Conservatives replaced Zuloaga with Miguel Miramon who had a record of victories but who repeatedly failed to capture the Liberal capital of Veracruz, which during the Battle of Antón Lizardo was protected by the United States Navy. Meanwhile the Liberals passed even more sweeping anti-clerical reforms, nationalizing the remainder of Catholic Church properties in order to continue funding the war effort. The controversial McLane–Ocampo Treaty was also signed with the United States by the Liberal government although it died in the American Senate. The tide of the war began to turn in 1860 as the Liberals finally began making inroads upon the Conservative controlled interior, culminating in the decisive Battle of Calpulalpan in December 22, 1860. Miramon and other leading Conservatives fled the country, while Conservative guerrillas remained active in the countryside.

=== Second French intervention ===
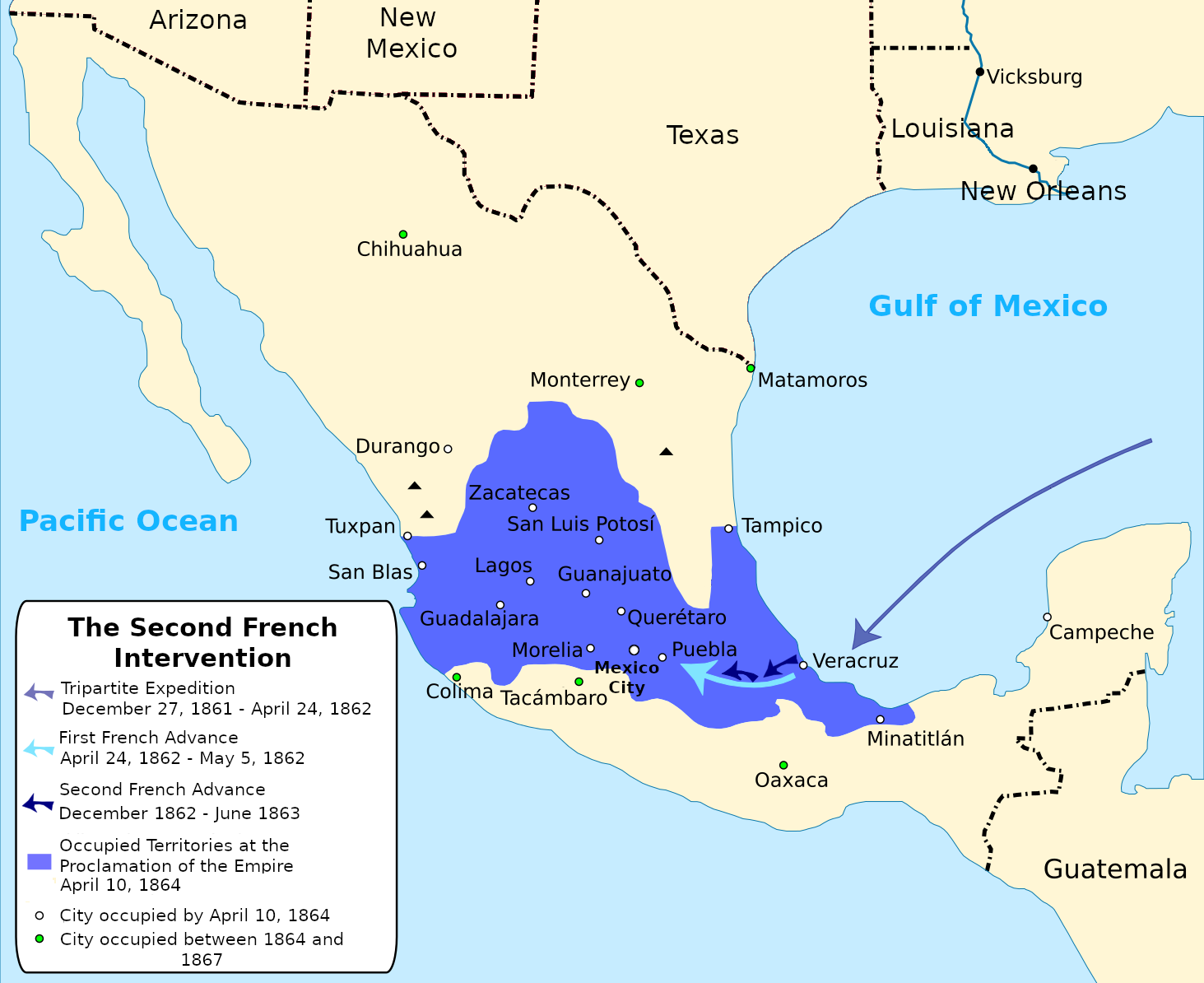
Map of the Intervention

President Juarez entered Mexico City in victory but now faced the task of rebuilding an exhausted and divided nation. A moratorium on foreign debt payments was passed in July, 1861 in order to meet Mexico's financial crisis, but France, the United Kingdom, and Spain responded with the Convention of London, agreeing to armed intervention in order to assure Mexico's debt payments. On 8 December 1861, the three navies occupied the port city of Veracruz.

France had ulterior motives in joining the Tripartite Expedition. Napoleon III intended to overthrow the Mexican Republic and establish a monarchical client state. The idea for invading Mexico and establishing a monarchy had reached Napoleon through two monarchist Mexican expatriates named José Manuel Hidalgo y Esnaurrízar, and José María Gutiérrez de Estrada, and the idea coincided with French imperial aims. Spain and the United Kingdom abandoned the Tripartite Expedition when they realized France's true intentions. Upon beginning the invasion in December 1861, however, Napoleon realized that Hidalgo and Estrada had exaggerated the monarchist sentiment, which did not truly exist even among Mexican Conservatives.

Furthermore, French troops were repulsed by Mexican troops at the Battle of Puebla on May 5, 1862, delaying French advances for over a year. Conservatives eventually found it convenient to collaborate with the invaders in their aims to return themselves in the wake of their loss in the Reform War, and many Conservative generals eventually began to join the French. Mexico City was taken by June, 1863, with President Juarez fleeing ahead of the French troops, and a French controlled triumvirate was set up as the new executive for the Mexican government. This triumvirate organized a Mexican Assembly of Notables and under French direction resolved on July 3, 1863, to change Mexico into a monarchy inviting Maximilian of Habsburg to assume the newly established Mexican throne. This proclamation ended the era of the Second Federal Republic of Mexico.

== Government ==
The Constitution of 1824 was reestablished in 1846, restoring the system of government that the nation had experienced during the First Mexican Republic. In 1853, Santa Anna briefly restored the centralist system that had reigned during the Centralist Republic of Mexico but he was overthrown in 1855. The Liberal government that came to power in the wake of the Plan of Ayutla narrowly voted against restoring the Constitution of 1824, and a constitutional convention was summoned that began work on a new constitution from 1856 to 1857. The subsequent Constitution of 1857 was implemented that year and triggered the War of Reform.

=== Constitution of 1857 ===
==== Civil rights ====
The Constitution of 1857 began by declaring man's inherent freedom. Slaves were declared free upon stepping on Mexican soil and contracts were automatically to be rendered null if they involved an undue loss of freedom. The latter was applied even to religious vows. Freedom of speech, freedom of the press, and freedom of petition were recognized, with freedom of the press to be limited only by "respect to private life, morality, and the public peace." For the first time the constitution of Mexico did not declare the nation to be a Catholic confessional state, but it did not explicitly guarantee religious freedom either. Special courts separate from the jurisdiction of the civil judiciary were declared abolished, a measure aimed at the independent court systems previously held by the clergy and the military respectively. Education and administration of justice were declared to be free of charge. Person and home were made inviolable with the exception of arrests by court issued warrant with a clearly defined criminal charge.

==== Economics ====
Under the Constitution of 1857, corporations civil or ecclesiastical were forbidden from owning land, a measure aimed at both the Catholic Church an Indigenous, collectively owned lands known as the ejidos. The seizure of private property by the government without due compensation was made illegal. Imprisonment for debt was made illegal. Monopolies were made illegal with exceptions made for the government in order to coin money and run the postal service.

==== Structure ====
The Constitution of 1857 restored the federalist system granting each state a level of sovereignty to be shared with the federal government. Both federal and the state governments continued to be divided into legislative, executive, and judicial branches. In contrast to previous Mexican constitutions, congress was also now made unicameral.

== Science and education ==
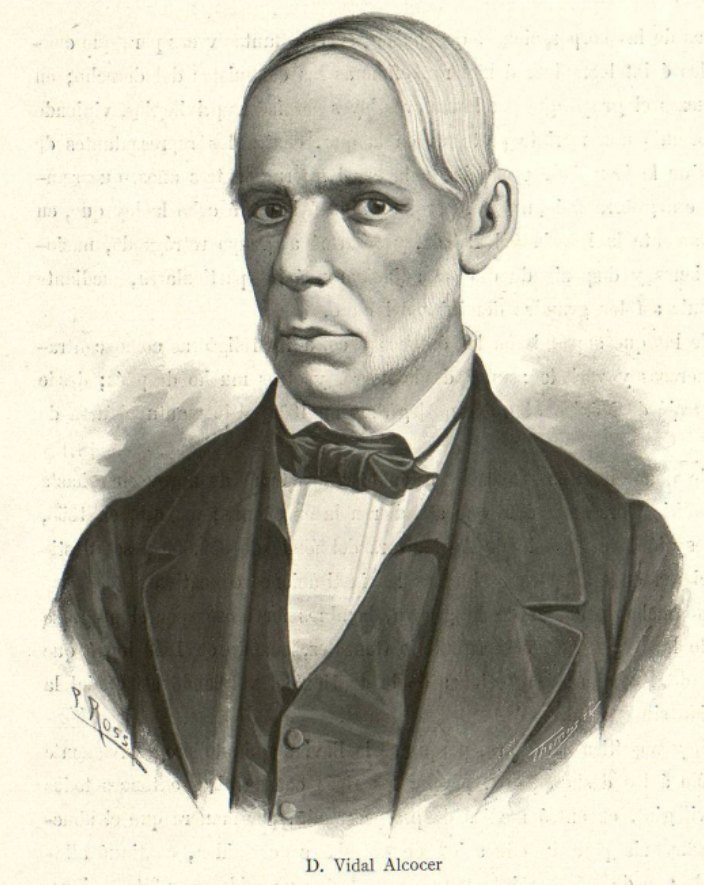
Vidal Alcocer, the Mexican philanthropist who founded and maintained a series of free schools during the era of the Second Republic.

There were 2,400 primary schools by 1860, an increase from 1,310 in 1843.

The Colegio de San Ildefonso established classes in drawing, French, English, and law. In 1850, the College of San Juan de Letran established chairs in athletics, bookkeeping, and carpentry. The College of St. Gregory established classes in athletics and typography, and begun also holding classes on agriculture.

In 1851, a school for teachers was founded in Guadalajara. A business college was founded in 1854. In 1856, Minister of Development Ignacio Siliceo passed a measure for the establishment of a School of Agriculture, and set aside funds for that purpose. In 1859, Dr. José Eleuterio González founded a school of medicine in Monterey.

A 'Society for the Beneficience for the education and mercy of poor children'(Sociedad Beneficiencia para la educacion y amparo de la ninez desvalida) was founded by the philanthropist Vidal Alcocer in October 1846. In 1858, the Society, in spite of an ongoing civil war, managed to raise funds for and maintain thirty three schools for poor children, attended by seven thousand students, teaching them reading and writing, grammar and arithmetic, art, religious instruction, and music. In at least one institution they also managed to provide food, board, and clothing.

The Academy of San Carlos, an art school flourished in the years immediately after the Mexican-American War, being funded through a national lottery. Its first art exposition was held in 1850. It was also the first public building in the country to be illuminated at night with gas lighting.

A naval school was established at Isla del Carmen in 1854. In 1857 another one was founded at the Fortress of San Juan de Ulúa.

The Commission of Military Statistics established in 1839 was reorganized as the Mexican Society of Geography and Statistics in 1850 and was officially incorporated in 1851 by congress which also granted the society an annual stipend. In 1860 it published a survey of Mexican languages. In 1862 it published a geographic report on Michoacán.

In 1859, the botanist Leonardo Oliva, published a survey of the flora in the state of Jalisco.

Mexican scholars compiled a ten volume Diccionario universal de historia y de geografía (Universal Dictionary of History and Geography) in the years from 1853 to 1856.

== Culture ==
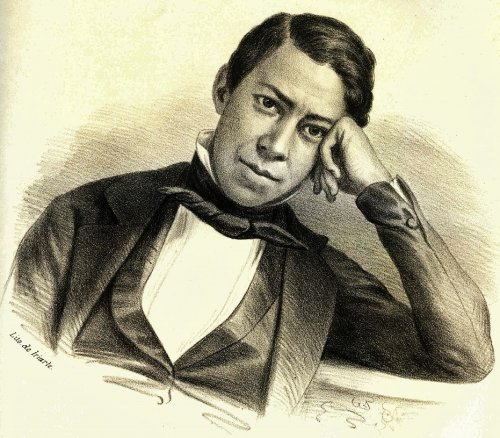
Fernando Orozco y Berra

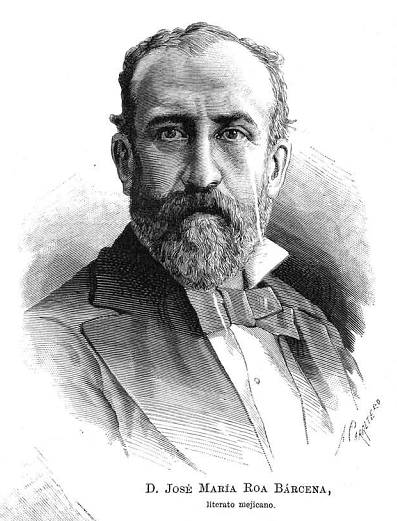
José María Roa Bárcena

The Liberal journalist Fernando Orozco y Berra, brother of historian Manuel Orozco y Berra, published his sole novel La guerra de 30 años (The Thirty Years War) during this period, concerned not with actual war, but with thirty years of the protagonist's tragic romances.

The Liberal writer and physician Juan Díaz Covarrubias was active during this period publishing the novels Impresiones y sentimientos (Impressions and Sentiments), La sensitiva (The Sensitive Soul), Gil Gómez, and La clase media (The Middle Class).

The Liberal writer Florencio María del Castillo published a series of novelettes and short stories during this period. Castillo wrote for the Liberal cause during the Reform War and took up arms during the French Intervention, eventually dying in French captivity in 1863.

The work of the blind poet Juan Valle first began appearing in Mexico City newspapers during this period. A noted partisan of the Liberal Party, Valle was forced to flee Guanajuato when it fell under the control of the Conservative Party during the Reform War. During the war he staged a semi autobiographical play called Misterios sociales (Social Mysteries).

Luis G. Inclán had been a rancher when the Mexican American War caused him to move to Mexico City, where he subsequently become a notable publisher.

The Conservative statesman Lucas Alamán produced his epochal History of Mexico in the years from 1849 to 1852.

The Conservative writer José María Roa Bárcena began literary career during this time, publishing Leyendas mexicanas, Cuentos y baladas del norte de Europa, y algunos otro (Mexican Legends, Stories and Ballads of Northern Europe, and other Poetic Attempts), Diana, and other works. Other Conservative poets active during this time included Manuel Carpio, and Alejandro Arango y Escandón.

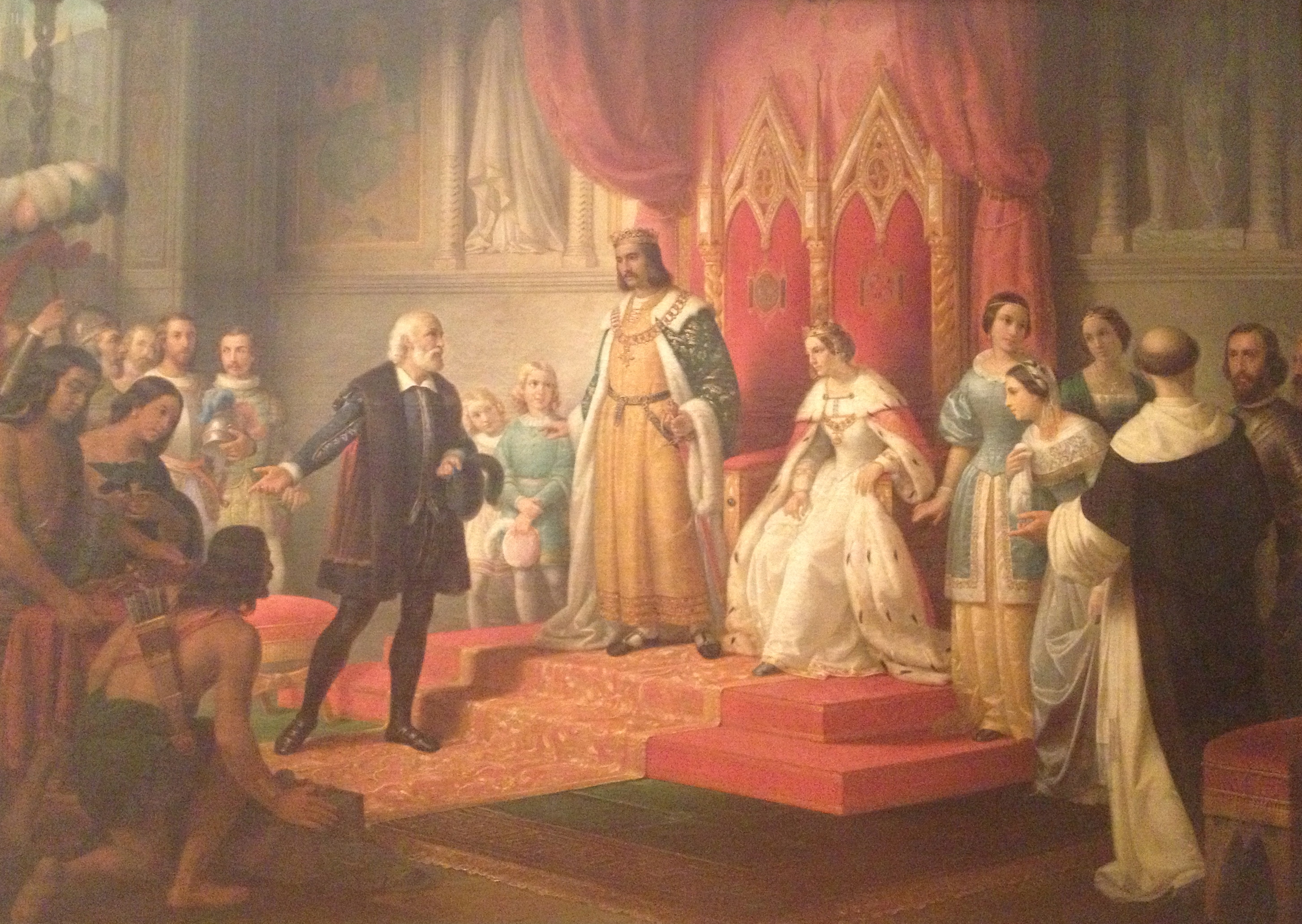
Cristobal Colon en la corte de los Reyes Catolicos (1850) by Juan Cordero.

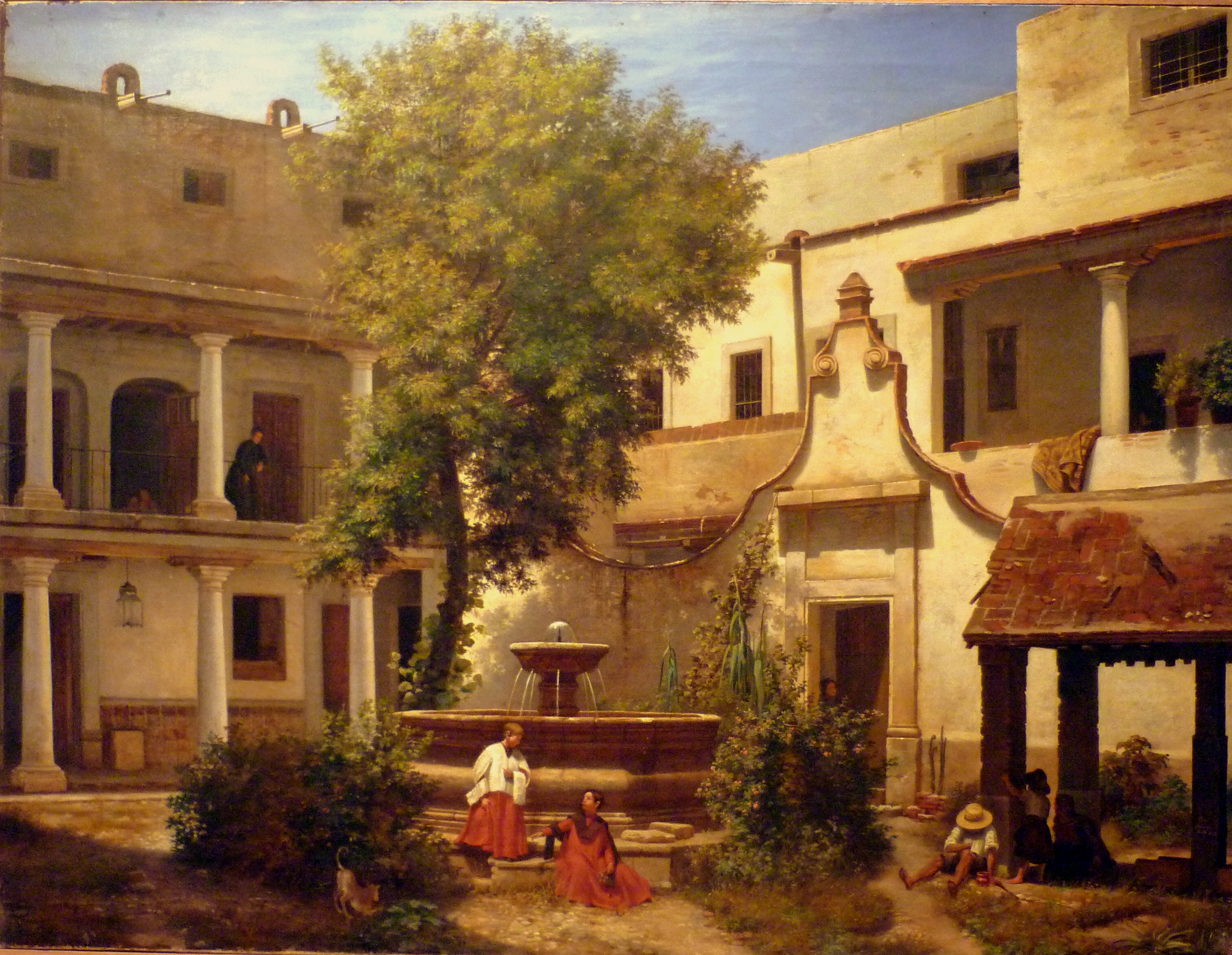
Interior del Colegio de Infantes de la Catedral de México (1857), José Jiménez.

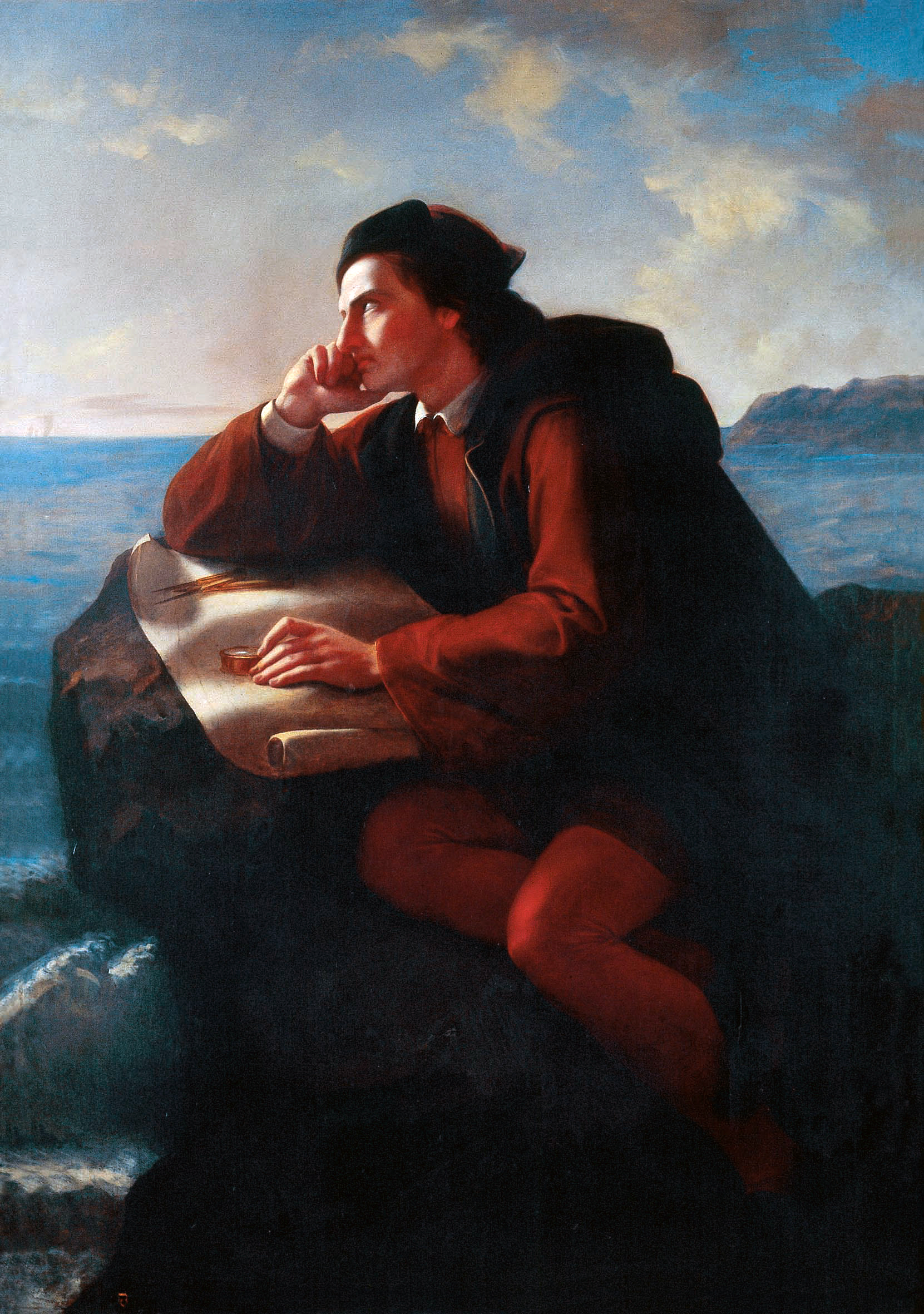
Inspiracion de Cristobal Colon (1856) by Jose Maria Obregon.
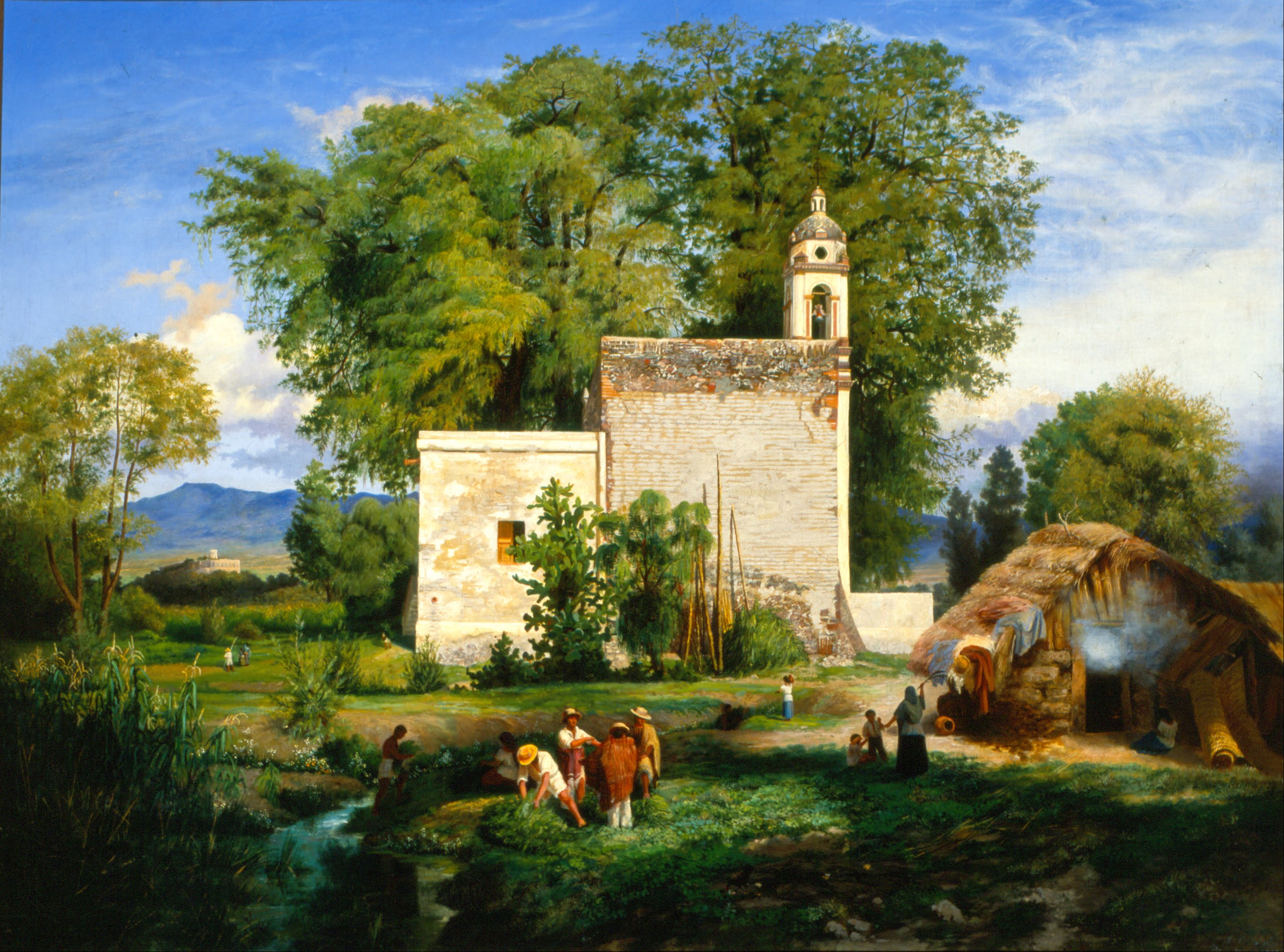
Paisaje de San Cristóbal Romita (1857) by Luis Coto.

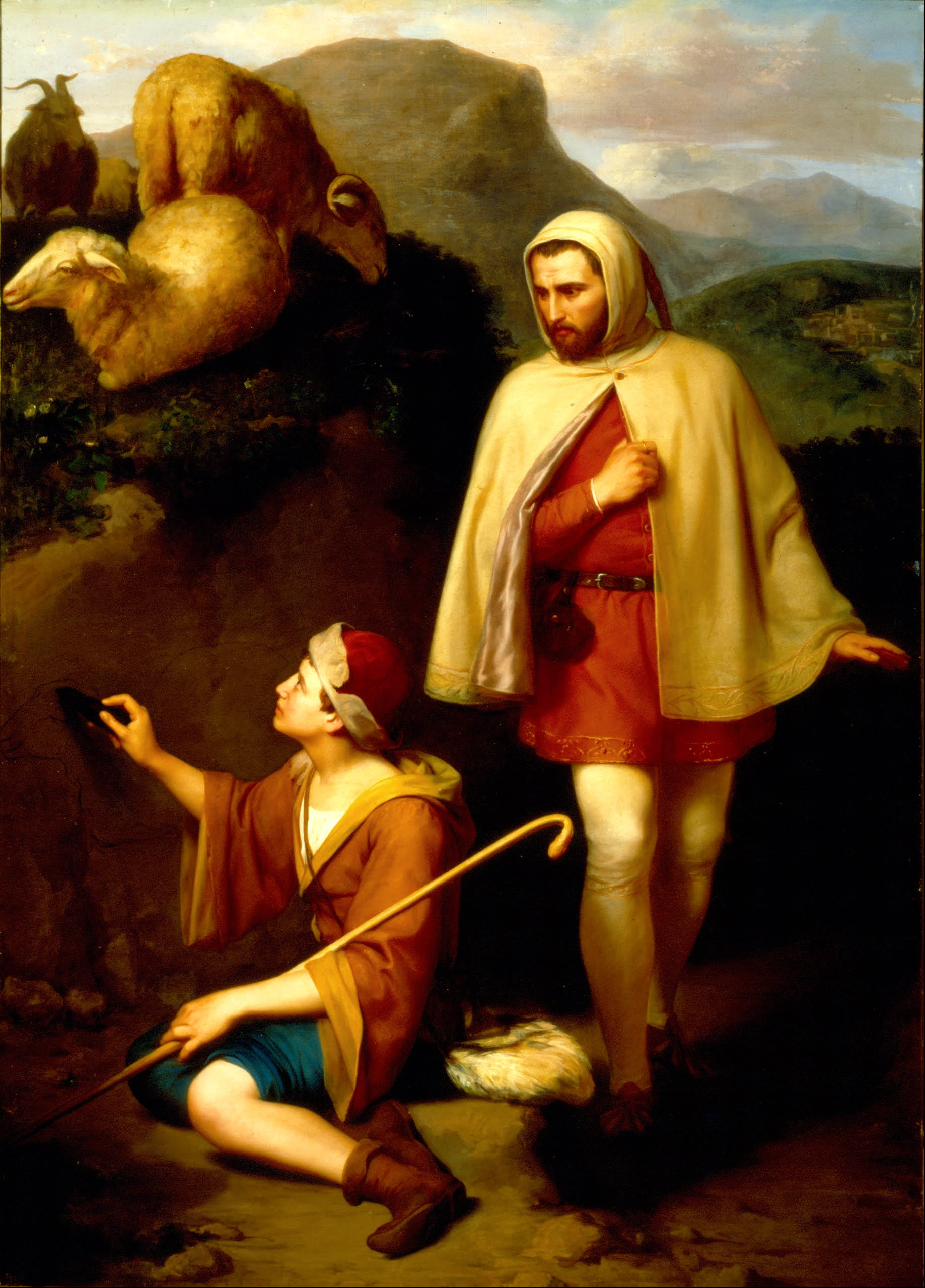
Giotto y Cimabue (1857), Jose Maria Obregon.

== Economy ==
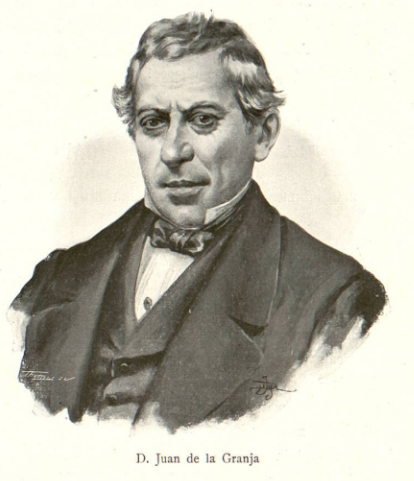
Juan de la Granja, the Spanish-Mexican engineer who constructed Mexico's first telegraphic network during the Second Republic.

=== Finances ===
On June 14, 1848, President Herrera passed a decree reforming the treasury department, reducing the budget for the civil service and the army, and presented a plan to congress for the consolidation of the national debt.

On November 30, 1850, the national debt was consolidated into one fund with the interest rate set at 3 percent, that was to receive twenty percent of custom house revenues. A committee was set up to manage the debt and oversee the collection of duties. Forty million pesos of bonds were set to be issued.

Mexico's chronic financial issues remained an imposing issue for the Arista administration and would ultimately lead to its fall. Government income stood at 8 million pesos while expenditure stood at 26 million. A goal was set to reduce the expenditure to 10 million pesos. In order to ameliorate the national finances Arista dramatically cut the salaries of public employees, up to seventy five percent in some cases but the cuts were applies unevenly many unnecessary expenditures remained. Finance Minister Payno resigned over differences on reducing the deficit.

In August, he summoned a council of governors to suggest better remedies. The governors' response was to attack the administration over its alleged lack of management and presented a new calculation of the national finances which showed no deficit at all. The government gained some slight concessions on budget cuts from congress, but the legislature was largely idle, and received condemnation from the press. Certain journals floated the idea that Arista should dissolve congress only to face arrest.

=== Infrastructure ===
In 1856, a commission for the drainage and canalization of the Valley of Mexico was appointed and offered a $12,000 reward to the engineer that offered it the best proposal.

In 1849, the Mexican Congress granted an exclusive ten year concession to the engineer Juan de la Granja to build electro-magnetic telegraphs throughout the Mexican Republic, under the conditions that within two years he should have built at least forty leagues of telegraphic line between Mexico City and Veracruz, and that official government correspondence would have priority, and that the Mexican government could interrupt communications along said line for reasons of national security. The Mexico City Veracruz line was finished by 1856 after which the government now made efforts to construct a line through Jalapa.

=== Trade ===
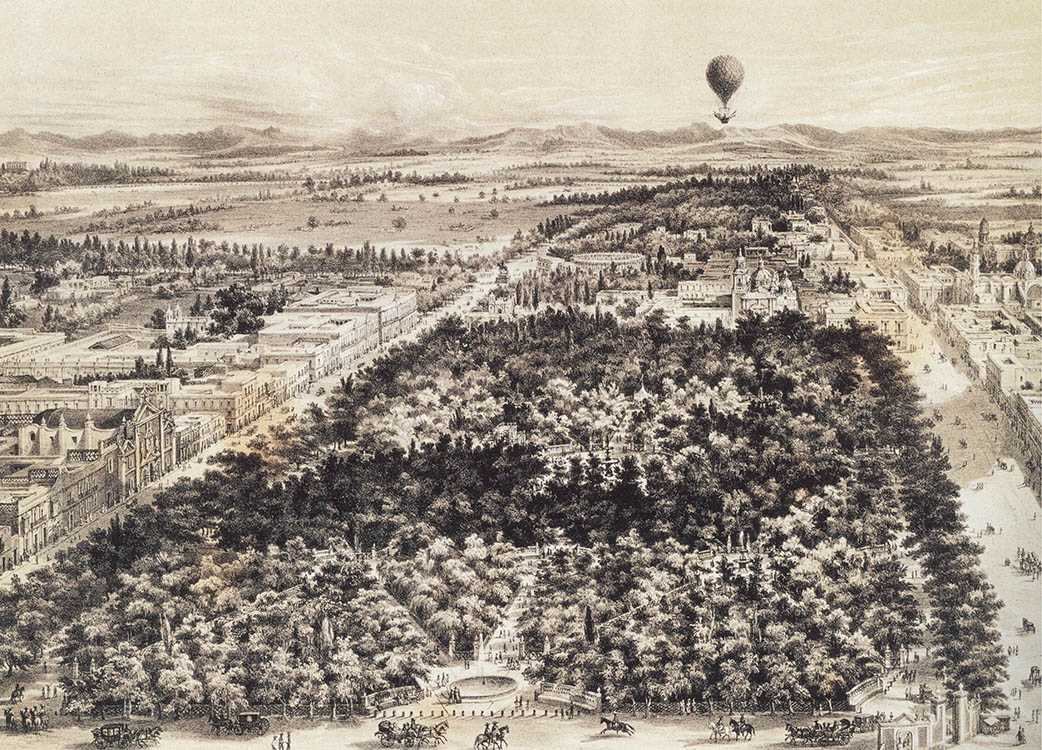
The Alameda Central in 1855 with a hot air balloon in the background

In 1854, Santa Anna passed discriminatory customs against nations which had no commercial treaty with Mexico, and this measure was repealed in 1856 by the liberals who had overthrown him. They instead lowered tariffs in general.

Cotton, which had long been subject to tariff restrictions to protect the Mexican textile industry was given permission in 1858 to be imported through the port of Vera Cruz by paying a dollar and a half per hundred pounds. In March 1858, the governor of Tamaulipas declared the establishment of a free economic zone along the Rio Grande where foreign goods were exempted from duties.

Customs records indicate that in 1851, 435 American vessels, 108 English, and 296 of other nations visited Mexican ports.

In 1856 a line of steamships was established between San Francisco and the Mexican ports of the Pacific.

In May, 1862, a mail line of steamers was established between Mexico and the United States, and postal regulations between the two nations were agreed upon.

=== Aquaculture ===
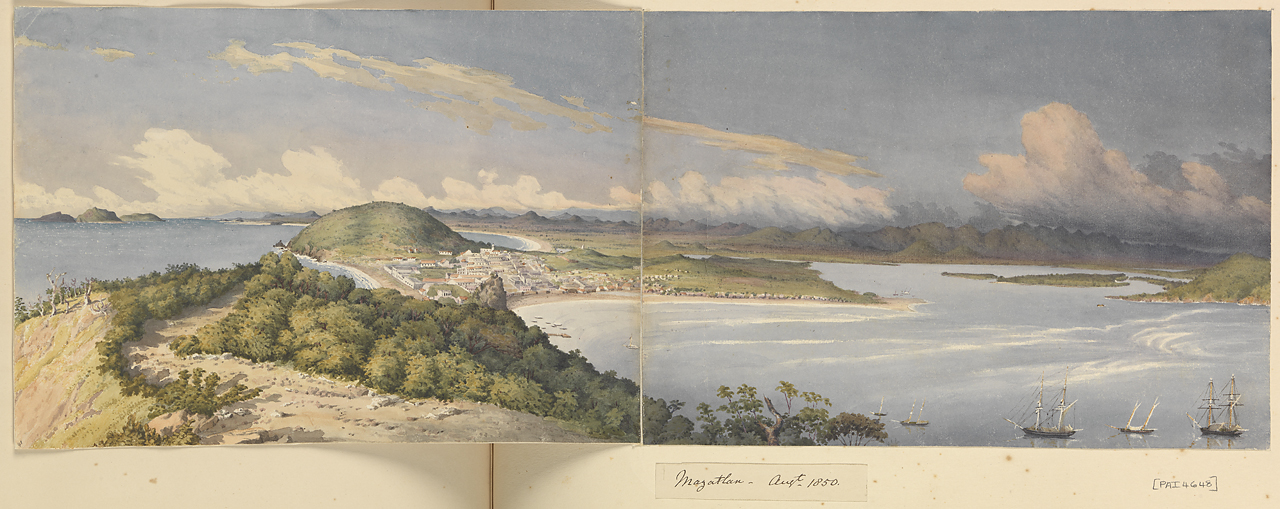
Port of Mazatlan, 1850

It was estimated in 1860 that the Mexican fishing industry was worth $750,000, and the shrimping industry $480,000. In that same year it was estimated that Mexican divers harvesting pearls, corals, oysters, sponges, and shells were producing $150,000 worth of goods annually.

=== Trade Fairs ===
National fairs at which industrial and agricultural goods were exhibited took place in 1850, 1853, 1854, 1856, and 1857. Awards recorded at these fairs include a first class premium award won by a pair of revolvers made in Angangueo, gold medals won by iron and tableware, silver medals won by iron chests, morocco leather and Mexican silk, and honorable mentions won by carriages.

The state government of Puebla in 1857 decreed that an annual exhibition of the natural and industrial products of the state should be held at the state capital.

=== Manufacturing ===
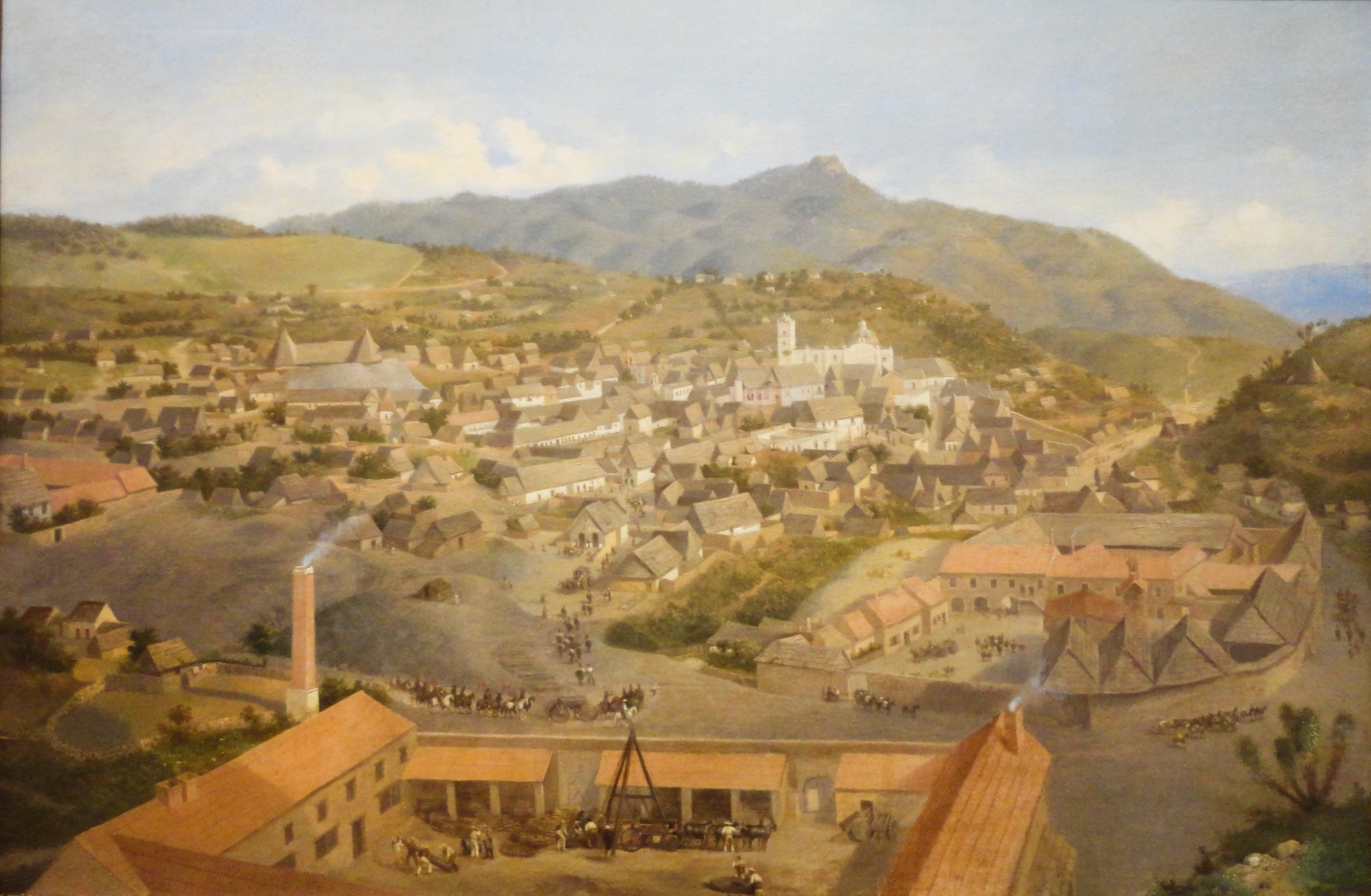
Real del Monte mine, c. 1850s

In 1860, twenty factories produced 41,258,700 pounds of tobacco valued at $16,503,480.

By 1850, the Mexican textile industry involved ten thousand looms, in comparison to the 2,600 which had existed in 1843.

The government in 1853, renewed a decree prohibiting any other than domestically produced paper to be used for official business.

By 1860, there were six paper factories producing 1,641,580 reams of paper valued at $6,366,320.

The Mexican textile industry progressed during this time despite the fact that some protectionist measures were lifted against some opposition.

By 1860, there were eight factories of cloth, kerseymere, and carpetings, producing goods valued at $2,720,000.

In 1857 there were five factories of glass and tableware employing 326 persons. By 1860, these had increased to twelve factories.

There were by 1857, 21 factories and shops producing and preparing silk with an output of 100,000 pounds, and employing eight thousand people.
