= Luis Gonzaga Cuevas =

Mexican politician

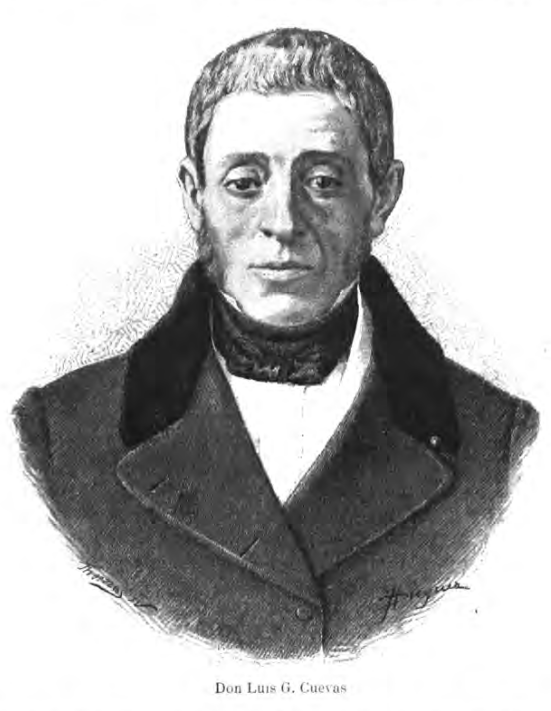

Minister of Interior and Exterior Relations
- In office 15 November 1848 – 2 May 1849
- President: José Joaquin de Herrera
- Preceded by: Mariano Otero
- Succeeded by: José María Ortiz Monasterio
- In office 7 December 1844 – 13 August 1845
- President: José Joaquin de Herrera
- Preceded by: Manuel Crescencio García Rejón
- Succeeded by: Manuel de la Peña y Peña
- In office 10 January 1838 – 13 November 1838
- President: Anastasio Bustamante
- Preceded by: José María Ortiz Monasterio
- Succeeded by: José Joaquín Pesado
- In office 21 April 1837 – 26 October 1837
- President: Anastasio Bustamante
- Preceded by: José María Ortiz Monasterio
- Succeeded by: José María Bocanegra

Personal details
- Born: Luis Gonzaga Cirilo de la Preciosa Sangre Cuevas Inclán; 10 July 1799 Lerma, New Spain
- Died: 12 January 1867 (aged 67) Mexico City, Mexico
- Party: Conservative
- Education: San Ildefonso College
- Awards: Order of Guadalupe; Order of Pope Pius IX

Luis Gonzaga Cuevas Inclán (Lerma de Villada, 10 July 1799 – City of Mexico, 12 January 1867) was a Mexican politician and diplomat. He studied law at the Antiguo Colegio de San Ildefonso in Mexico City and worked as a lawyer. He began to hold public office at age 25 and in 1826 entered as an official in the Secretariat (Ministry) of Interior and Exterior Relations. He was in charge of Mexican embassies in Prussia and Britain, and briefly served as Secretary (Minister) of Foreign Affairs on two occasions during the second government of President Anastasio Bustamante (April–October 1837 and January–November 1838).

Appointed plenipotentiary for Bustamante to negotiate with France, he could not end the so-called Pastry War. Also in the presidential cabinet he had to occupy temporarily the Ministry of Interior twice over 1838. Jose Joaquin de Herrera, interim president of the Republic, reappointed him Foreign Secretary in December 1844, a position he held until August the following year.

He defended before the Mexican Congress the Treaty of Guadalupe Hidalgo, in which he took part in negotiations as one of the three Mexican representatives and by which peace was agreed on 2 February 1848 after the Mexican–American War. Herrera, already as constitutional president, called him again to exercise the portfolio of Interior and Exterior Relations between November 1848 and May 1849. He was the first Foreign Minister appointed by the interim president Felix Maria Zuloaga, but resigned in July 1858 (six months after taking office) before the confrontation that involved the Reform War. He was prosecuted after the 1861 triumph of the liberal forces led by Benito Juarez. He rejected the appointments and charges for those who had been appointed by Emperor Maximilian I from 1864 and died three years later in Mexico City.
