= José Joaquín Pesado =

Mexican politician

José Joaquín Pesado Pérez
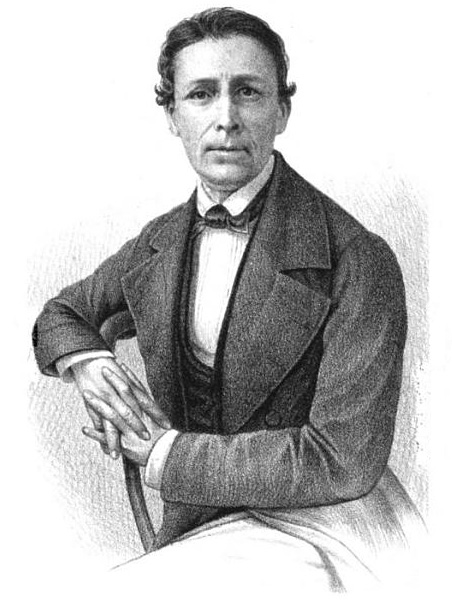

Minister of Interior and Exterior Relations
- In office 14 November 1838 – 10 December 1838
- President: Anastasio Bustamante
- Preceded by: Luis Gonzaga Cuevas
- Succeeded by: Manuel Gómez Pedraza

Personal details
- Born: 9 February 1801 Palmar de Bravo, New Spain
- Died: 3 March 1861 (aged 60) Mexico City, Mexico
- Party: Conservative

José Joaquín Pesado Pérez (Palmar de Bravo, Puebla, New Spain, 9 February 1801 — Mexico City, 3 March 1861) was a Mexican writer, journalist, poet and politician. He was born in San Agustín del Palmar, Puebla, in 1801 and died in Mexico City in 1861. In 1822, he married María de la Luz de la Llave y Segura, and Juana Segura Argüelles twenty years later.

Pesado was Secretariat of Foreign Affairs (es:Secretario de Relaciones Exteriores, Gobernación y Policía), Interior Minister (es: Ministerio del Interior), Foreign minister (es:Ministro de Relaciones Exteriores), and Governor of Veracruz (es: Gobernador de Veracruz). He joined the nineteenth-century literary society the Academia de Letrán. He was also a member of the Academia Mexicana de la Lengua and professor of philosophy. He published in El Radical and El Año Nuevo. He was editor of El Mosaico Mexicano, El Recreo de las familias, El Nuevo Año and La Cruz.
