= Luis de la Rosa Oteiza =

Mexican politician

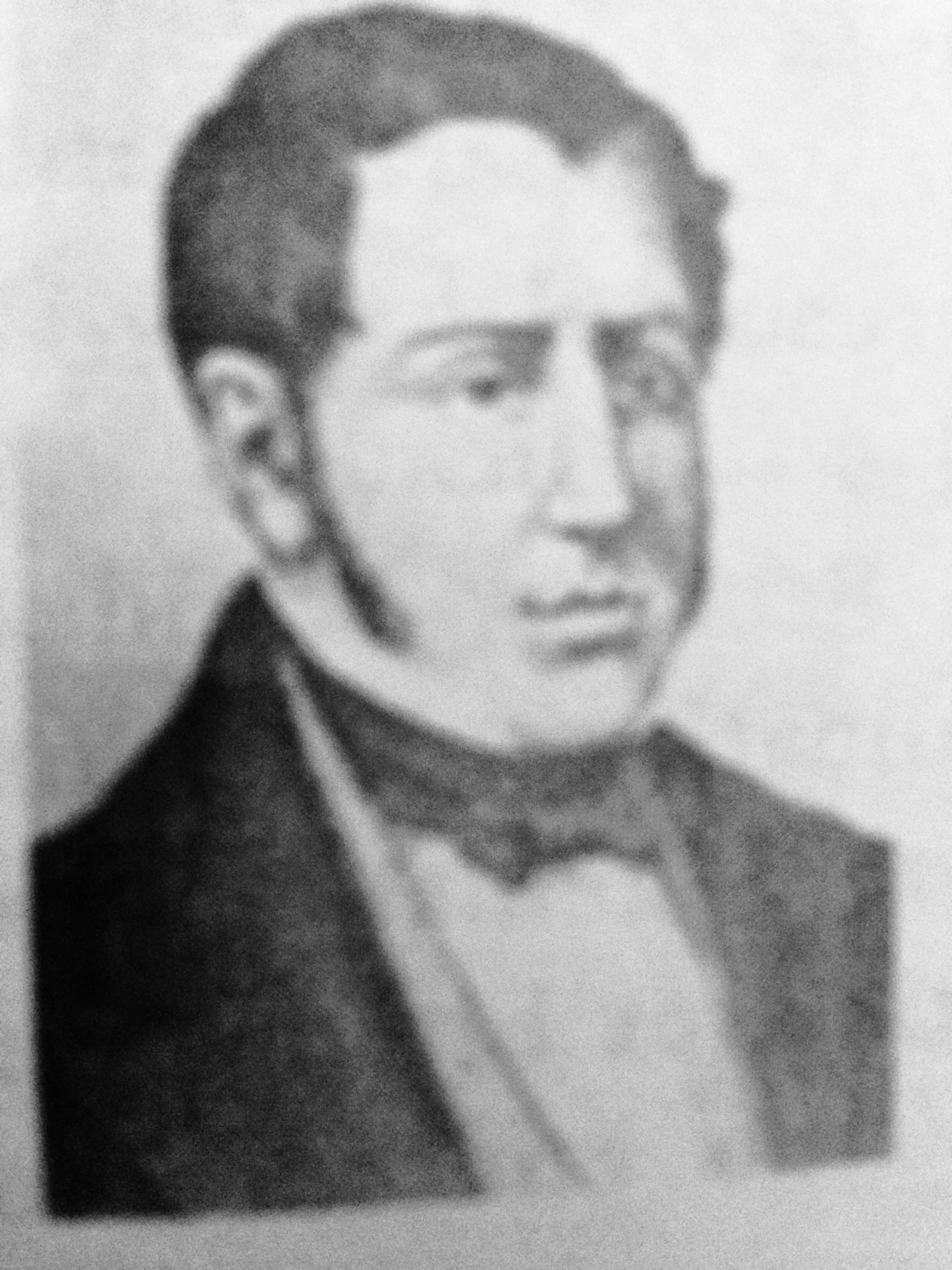

Personal details
- Born: José Luis Antonio de Santa Rita de la Rosa y Oteiza; 23 May 1804 Mineral de Pinos, Zacatecas
- Died: 2 September 1856 (aged 52) Mexico City
- Children: Julia
- Education: San Luis Gonzaga College (Zacatecas)

José Luis Antonio de Santa Rita de la Rosa y Oteiza (23 May 1804 – 2 September 1856) was a Mexican 19th-century politician who served as interim minister in several cabinets, as governor of Puebla, as President of the Chamber of Deputies in 1845., and as congressman in the Constituent Congress of 1856. During the presidency of Manuel de la Peña y Peña in the final months of the Mexican–American War, de La Rosa headed all four government ministries.

Aside from his political activities, De la Rosa worked as journalist for several publications, served as envoy extraordinary and minister plenipotentiary of Mexico to the United States from 22 December 1848 to 10 January 1852 and died shortly after being elected president of the Supreme Court of Justice.

== Works ==
- Memoria sobre el cultivo de maiz en México (1846).
- Miscelánea de escritos descriptivos (1848).
- Impresiones de un viage de México á Washington en octubre y noviembre de 1848 (1849).
- Observaciones sobre varios puntos concernientes a la administracion publica del estado de Zacatecas (1851).
