= Monarchism in Mexico =

History and support of the Mexican monarchy

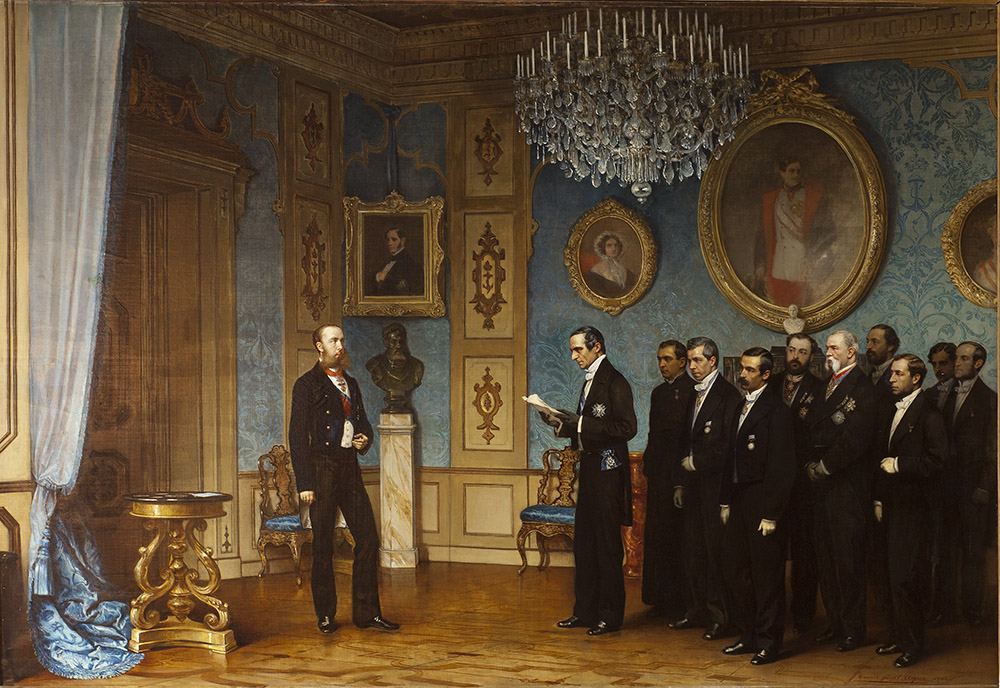
A Mexican deputation offers the Mexican throne to Austrian Archduke Maximilian

Monarchism in Mexico is the political ideology that defends the establishment, restoration, and preservation of a monarchical form of government in Mexico. Monarchism was a recurring factor in the decades during and after Mexico's struggle for independence.

Beginning in 1808, it was unclear near the ending of the kingdom of the Viceroyalty of New Spain what form of government—monarchical or republican—might replace the absolutism of Ferdinand VII of Spain, but the default position in that era was monarchy. In 1821, Mexico declared the Independence of the Mexican Empire. However, lacking a prince to ascend the Throne of Mexico, Agustín de Iturbide, a criollo royalist general who made an alliance with the insurgents for independence, was proclaimed president of the Regency. His Plan of Iguala united factions for independence and envisioned a sovereign nation, with the stated hope that the new state would be led by a member of the Spanish royal family or a prince from another European royal house.

In the absence, still, of a willing or unprohibited candidate from an established royal house, Iturbide was elected Emperor of Mexico by the Mexican congress in 1822 as Agustín I. Conflicts between congress and the emperor, coupled with the emperor's struggle to pay the military which propped up his regime, led to the empire's collapse. The emperor abdicated and went into exile in 1823. Mexico established a federal republic under the Constitution of 1824, but the idea of monarchy continued among Mexican conservatives.

Mexican monarchism was discredited following the First Mexican Empire's fall, and some scholars have written that "there was no effective monarchist support in Mexico between the Empire of Iturbide and the Empire of Maximilian." Nonetheless, monarchists such as Lucas Alamán continued to hope that monarchy was a viable solution to Mexico's political turmoil by inviting a European prince to assume the Mexican throne, following the precedent set by nations such as the United Kingdom, Greece, and Belgium, who elected their monarchs from different countries. Many in the Conservative Party continued to voice monarchical aspirations as early as 1832, with many believing that "only a monarchy could save Mexico from anarchy and the United States". Regardless, "many times, the monarchist proposals were little more than private intrigues, lacking any real support".

These ideas attracted interest in European courts, culminating in a French intervention in Mexico in 1861, with the aim of helping the Conservative party establish a Mexican monarchy, this time with Archduke Maximilian of Austria as emperor. The idea of monarchy gained increasing Mexican support following the military defeat of conservatives in the War of the Reform, sparked by the promulgation of the liberal Constitution of 1857. The victorious liberal government of Benito Juárez suspended payment to bond holders, which gave European powers the pretext to intervene militarily for debt collection. In these circumstances, Mexican conservatives invited Archduke Maximilian to become emperor as French forces of Napoleon III invaded central Mexico. The establishment of the Empire by French troops, with support of Mexican Imperial forces, tainted the imperial regime's legitimacy from the start. This was further compounded by the fact that Juárez never left the national territory and was considered the legitimate head of state by the United States. Mexican conservatives expected the monarch to adhere to conservative principles, but Emperor Maximilian was politically a liberal and ratified many of the reforms of the liberal republican government that his regime displaced. The Second Mexican Empire was established when the U.S. was engaged in its civil war (1861–65), and with its end could give material support to Juárez's republican forces. With Napoleon III's withdrawal of French forces in 1866–67, the Empire collapsed in 1867. Emperor Maximilian was captured, tried, and executed. His execution by firing squad at the hands of the Restored Republic marked the end of monarchy in Mexico.

== The Spanish legacy ==
For over 300 years, the colony of New Spain was ruled by viceroys representing the King of Spain. Only three of the viceroys were ever born in Mexico, the rest having been born in Spain, and usually going back after a few years of ruling.

During this time, two royal houses ruled Mexico. The House of Habsburg ruled Mexico from the conquest up until the War of Spanish Succession in 1714 when control of Spain and her colonies passed over to the House of Bourbon which began a program of centralization known as the Bourbon reforms.

The first proposal for an independent Mexican monarchy came about in 1783, after Spain's support for the successful American War of Independence. Pedro Pablo Abarca de Bolea, 10th Count of Aranda, proposed to Charles III of Spain the establishment of a Spanish Commonwealth with independent kingdoms in New Spain, Peru, and New Granada ("Costa Firme") as a compromise between Spain's colonial interests and the strengthening trend of decolonization. Spain would retain direct control of Cuba, Puerto Rico, and other islands deemed necessary for Spanish trade, while the king would assume the overarching title of "emperor of the Indies". The proposal was thoroughly ignored by the king.

== Monarchism and Mexican independence ==
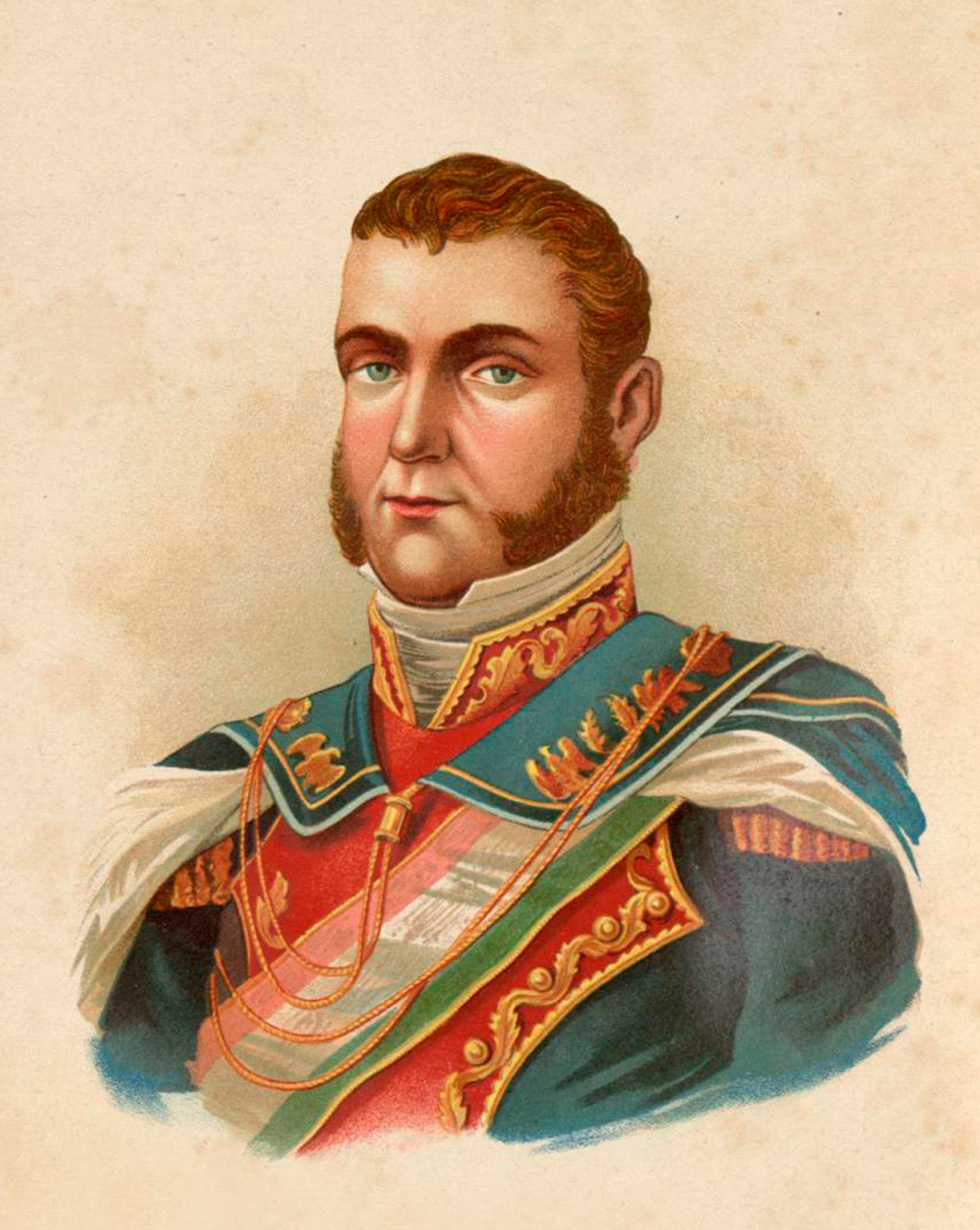
Agustín de Iturbide

Mexico gained its independence in 1821, under the leadership of Agustín de Iturbide who sought to revive the commonwealth idea through the Plan of Iguala, which stipulated for Mexico to be an independent monarchy, nonetheless with a monarch from the royal Spanish family. The plan was ratified by the Spanish viceroy Juan O'Donojú through the Treaty of Córdoba and commissioners were sent to Spain to offer the Mexican throne to a Spanish prince. The Spanish government however, rejected the matter out of fear that any concession in favor of Mexican independence would cause Spain to entirely lose its influence in Mexico, and under the false assumption that there was still a significant pro-Spanish party in Mexico.

After news of the rejection arrived in Mexico there were mass demonstrations in favor of elevating Iturbide to the throne, and congress held an extraordinary session on the matter. Within congress there were both monarchists and republicans, but monarchism at this point was divided at this point into two factions: those in favor of crowning Iturbide, and those who had not yet given up hopes on inviting a Spanish prince to the throne. On May 18, 1822, congress elected Agustín de Iturbide as Mexico's first Emperor.

It was around this time that José Joaquín Fernández de Lizardi wrote a monarchist pamphlet, endorsing the establishment of a constitutional monarchy under Iturbide, recognizing the debates going on at the time over the ideal form of government for Mexico, but also arguing that the form of government matter less than whether or not a government acts justly. Lizardi also published a pro-Iturbide newspaper known as Pensador Mexicano.

After his coronation, Iturbide alienated his supporters when in the struggles between congress and the crown, it became clearer that Iturbide wanted to totally dominate the legislature, betraying the ideal of a constitutional monarchy. The Emperor shut congress down and replaced it with a smaller body of loyal deputies. Iturbide's pretext for closing the legislature had been that congress had accomplished nothing in the eight months it had been in session, work on a constitution had not begun despite that being the main purpose for its convocation, and that the matters of justice and finance had been completely neglected. Nonetheless, the emperor himself was unable to bring order into the finances of the nation, and the military began to grumble at their lack of pay. The military turned against Iturbide, and unable to defeat the insurrection, Iturbide reassembled congress, and offered his abdication in April 1823 being exiled from the nation shortly after. When he attempted to return in 1824, Iturbide was captured and executed.

In 1828, Spain attempted to reconquer Mexico, and the conservative paper El Sol pondered the Bourbonist cause, ultimately arguing that it was futile to join the Spaniards when popular opinion against Bourbon rule was overwhelming, and so it urged all its readers to unite patriotically against the Spanish intervention.

In 1835, Spain's queen regent Maria Christina of the Two Sicilies recognized the independence of Mexico in return for Mexico assuming the debt contracted by the Spanish colonial government as propia y nacional ("[their] own and national"), leaving both countries "free and without any responsibility" to each other. In 1847 Mexico agreed to create a special debt-payment fund to settle this debt, turning it into foreign debt. This was the origin of the 1861 debt claim that justified the Convention of London and the Second French intervention in Mexico.

== Plan of Chicontla ==
A pronunciamiento for a "plan for an indigenous monarchy" was made in Chicontla (Puebla), on 2 February 2, 1834 by the priests Carlos Tepisteco Abad and Epigmenio de la Piedra. The plan called for the establishment of a congress with representation of one deputy per 100,000 citizens, who would draft a "moderate" monarchist constitution, elect an emperor, and form a state council within six months. The emperor would be chosen by draw, from among "twelve celibate young men" born and resident in Mexico, who could demonstrate direct descent from Moctezuma II. The winner would have to swear fealty to the Catholic Church, the new constitution, and the integrity of national territory. If Indian, he would have to marry a white woman, and if white, a "pure Indian" woman. Additionally, a permanent elective state council would be established, formed by one Indian and one 40-year-old person chosen from among the other races. The project was unpopular and did not have any relevance.

== Gutiérrez de Estrada's essay ==
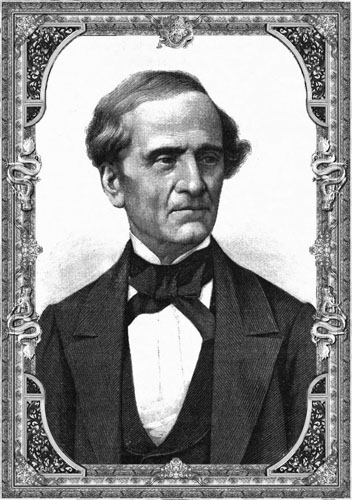
José María Gutiérrez de Estrada

In 1840, in the aftermath of the Federalist Revolt of 1840 which had led to twelve days of fighting in Mexico City and substantial damage to the National Palace, José María Gutiérrez de Estrada published a pamphlet advocating for a constitutional convention to examine what had gone wrong with the nation. He also argued that the convention ought to be given the power to suggest any form of government as a remedy for Mexico, and openly argued that a monarchy headed by a foreign prince was the best form of government for Mexico at the time.

He strongly criticized the notion that there was one ideal form of government for all nations and all circumstances and pointed out the troubled history of the French First Republic as an example. He also warned that the chaos Mexico was experiencing was inevitably leading to foreign intervention. He warned of a future American annexation of Mexico, and preferred to at least have the choice of selecting a foreign monarch who would have a vested interest in the success of Mexico.

The Mexican government reacted to the pamphlet by characterizing it as treasonous and as an incitement to civil war. Multiple refutations were penned. The publisher was imprisoned, and Gutiérrez Estrada was exiled to Europe. Nonetheless, the Mexican–American War bore out some of Estrada's predictions, encouraging him in his continued campaign to establish a monarchy. One of Estrada's critics at the time, General Juan Almonte would later change his opinion on monarchy and become a key figure in the establishment of the Second Mexican Empire.

== Spanish conspiracy ==
=== Narváez government ===
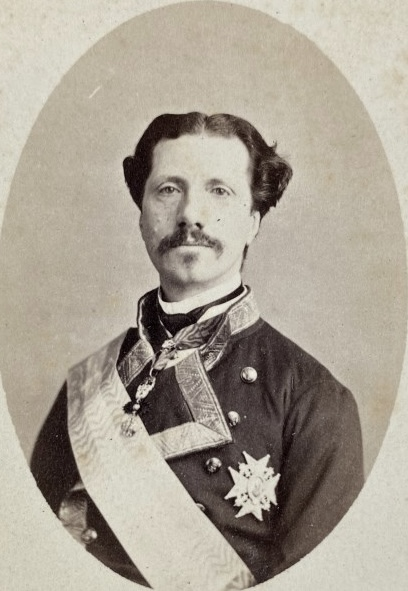
Infante Enrique, Duke of Seville

In 1845 the Spanish prime minister Ramón María Narváez gave secret instructions to the Spanish minister to Mexico Salvador Bermúdez de Castro to turn Mexico into a constitutional monarchy under a prince of the Spanish royal family. By August, the minister had the support of Mexican general Mariano Paredes, politician Lucas Alamán, and the sympathies of wealthy businessmen, landowners, high clergy, people persecuted by the Liberal Party, and the northern Mexican states. Paredes would march from San Luis Potosí to Mexico City after a requirement by notables and high-ranking military to overthrow the government of José Joaquín Herrera, citing the latter's passiveness against US expansionism. Once in the capital, Paredes would dissolve congress and appoint an assembly of notables that would return to the Plan of Iguala and ask Spain to provide a monarch.

Paredes and Alamán favored Infanta Luisa Fernanda of Spain, due to her being a daughter of Ferdinand VII, but Isabella II preferred Infante Enrique, Duke of Seville. Foreign minister Francisco Martínez de la Rosa stressed that Spanish involvement should be secret and the election of the sovereign appear to be the will of Mexico, born of the "favorable memory left by Spanish domination and the veneration of its dynasty", yet correspond in reality to the queen of Spain.

De la Rosa provided Bermúdez de Castro with 10 million Spanish reales in Havana (2 for expenses and 8 after success), but this sum was insufficient since Paredes needed 200,000 Mexican pesos (4 million reales) alone to maintain his army and march on Mexico City. Paredes's allies had difficulty raising money without revealing the conspiracy. Furthermore, rumors of a restoration appeared in Spain and progressively made it to Cuba, the United States, and Mexico. The arrival of Enrique to Havana on the frigate Isabel II fueled more suspicion.

In December, Paredes led the coup ousting Herrera. His manifesto, praising the Spanish colonial administration and implying that a monarchy would be beneficial for the nation, was written by Bermúdez de Castro without the knowledge of even Paredes. Paredes was unhappy with the lack of Spanish financial support, but Bermúdez de Castro won generals Nicolás Bravo and Anastasio Bustamante to the Infante's candidacy. However, generals Gabriel Valencia, Juan Almonte, and José María Tornel wanted Paredes to offer assurances of the survival of the republican system, which Paredes added to the plan. Paredes even considered resigning from the presidency in favor of Almonte, but the Spanish minister convinced him to stay and release a second manifesto without republican references. The call for a new congress was written jointly by Alamán and Bermúdez de Castro after Alamán had trouble doing it alone.

=== El Tiempo ===
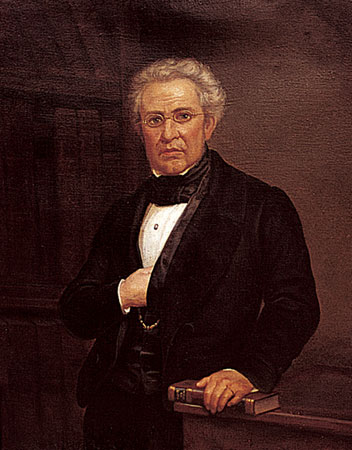
Lucas Alamán

In January 1846, Bermúdez de Castro was informed of the money in Havana. He took the 2 million available and requested access to the remaining 8 million to create a journal, hire writers to promote monarchism, and buy the support or neutrality of influential people in the upcoming national assembly. The journal El Tiempo began publishing on 24 January under the leadership of Lucas Alamán. The presentation of the journal, written by Bermúdez de Castro, omitted the word monarchy but supported the San Luis manifesto and defended that Mexico must be willing to explore any form of government that was most suitable for the nation. The principal contributors were Alamán, Francisco Manuel Sánchez de Tagle, Manuel Díez de Bonilla, and José Hilario Elguero y Guisasola.

El Tiempo blamed the influence of the United States in damaging Mexican political thought. The framers of the 1824 Constitution of Mexico copied U.S. institutions under the assumption that it was those institutions that were responsible for the wealth of the nation, but the journal argued that the U.S. had great wealth already in colonial times, and that many monarchies in Europe were also prosperous. They ascribed the wealth of the United States to their trade with Great Britain, and the continuation of commercial links after independence. It was also argued that constitutions lack the power to create societies, but are rather the codifications of societal customs that have developed over time and that a constitution must fit the custom, character, and requirements of each nation. On 12 February, the journal moved from advocating that Mexico find a more suitable form of government to openly endorse constitutional monarchy with the unsigned article "Our profession of faith", which argued that liberty, democracy, and national development can exist well under such a state, as demonstrated by the leading European nations of the time. The article, likely written jointly by Alamán and Bermúdez de Castro at the suggestion of Paredes, who wanted to test public opinion, created great controversy.

General Manuel Montoro sued the publication and a case was opened against the editor, Antonio Nájera. Liberal journals banded together against El Tiempo. La Reforma began a back and forth dispute with the publication, attempting to refute its points. The editors of La Reforma nonetheless welcomed discussion on the merits of monarchy, but warned El Tiempo that a call for foreign intervention ought to be prosecuted as treason.

Carlos María de Bustamante joined the discussion with two articles in El Memorial Histórico, both titled Mexico no quiere rey, y menos un extranjero ("Mexico wants no king, and even less a foreigner"). Bustamante defended republican institutions, attacked the monarchy as alien to the people of Mexico, and accused the Spanish diaspora in Mexico of being behind such proposals. La Hesperia, one of two Spanish-owned journals in Mexico City, reprimanded Bustamante, and Bermúdez de Castro lodged a protest to Mexican foreign minister Joaquín María del Castillo y Lanzas, demanding his retraction. In March, Bustamante wrote a new article "To my republican nation", in which he claimed to have not wished to offend Spain's rights, Isabella II, or Maria Christina, but did not retract his defense of the Mexican republic. Bustamante reproduced the article in his book El nuevo Bernal Díaz del Castillo ("The new Bernal Díaz del Castillo"), adding a commentary in which he attacked Bermúdez de Castro.

Also in March, Bermúdez de Castro created a second journal, El Mosquito Mexicano, to support monarchism. However, due to the attacks of the republican press against Paredes, which called him a "bourbonist" and "enemy of the fatherland" who wished "to give the country to a foreign prince", the government banned journals from discussing politics, which damaged the monarchists the most.

=== Miraflores government ===
In February 1846, Paredes suggested sending ambassadors to Great Britain and France to ask if they would support a monarchy in Mexico, but Bermúdez de Castro convinced him to leave this to Spain. The Spanish ministers to London, Paris, and Washington, D.C. sounded the question of regime change in Mexico and their support, always framed as if coming from the Mexicans. The French government responded positively.

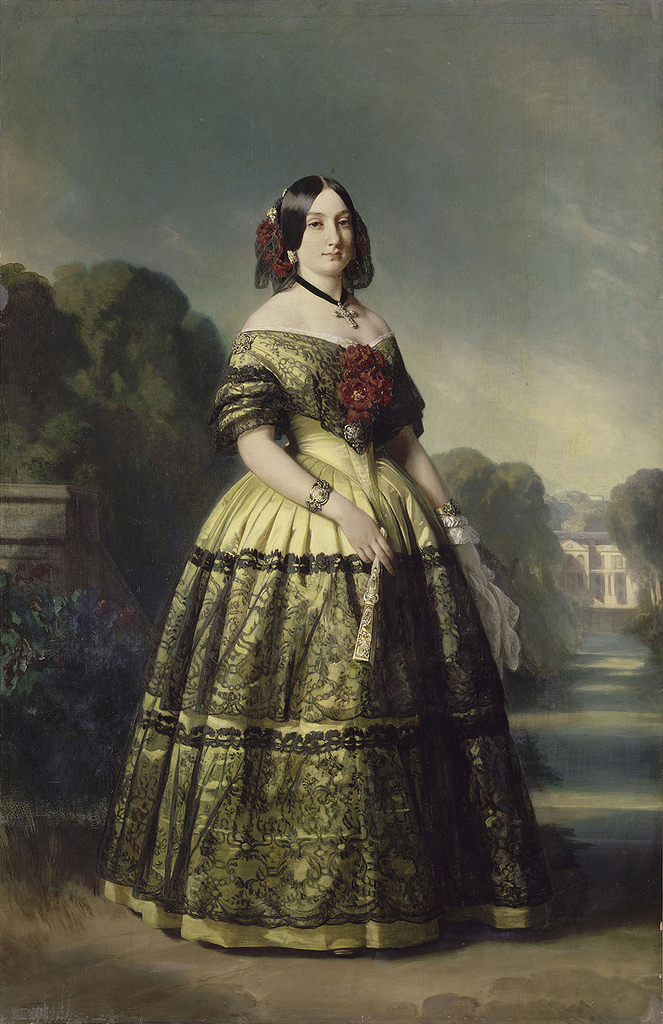
Infanta Luisa Fernanda of Spain in 1847

On 12 February Narváez was replaced by Manuel de Pando, 6th Marquess of Miraflores as prime minister. Doubling as foreign minister and a seasoned diplomat himself, Miraflores gave absolute priority to reviewing the Mexican plot and wrote a memorandum criticizing virtually every aspect of it. Per Miraflores, Bermúdez de Castro was too young and inexperienced, and the plan appeared easy but Mexico, while unstable, was still an independent country. The plot was in itself unfair and immoral, a betrayal of a friendly government that had given Bermúdez de Castro accreditation as ambassador; Spain had no right to influence the government of Mexico anymore than foreign powers had the right to influence Spain's. Additionally, regime change in Mexico may be very likely, but not its consolidation, and Spain's participation could lead to conflict with the United States in a time when Spain was militarily weak.

Regarding candidates, Miraflores considered that Infante Carlos María Isidro of Spain would require mediation by Britain and France due to his exile and dynastic conflict with Isabel II, and would be rejected by the Mexicans due to his absolutism anyway. Infante Francisco de Paula would have to leave Spain with his sons Francisco de Asís and Enrique, though this would also help establish a strong dynasty. Luisa Fernanda would have to marry a European prince and renounce her rights of succession to Spain before leaving for Mexico; Spain should not allow her to depart unmarried, nor allow Mexico to choose her husband. Regardless of candidate, the matter should be discussed by the council of ministers reunited with Isabella II and her mother Maria Christina, because the latter had been named head of the royal family in Ferdinand VII's will.

Despite this criticism, Miraflores told Bermúdez de Castro that he approved his conduct and had given him access to the whole Havana sum, but that he should be cautious with it, abstain of signing any document, and not make his involvement known in any way. If the assembly proclaimed the monarchy under a Spanish prince and he was asked about it by the British ambassador, he should say that Isabel II felt flattered but that Spain would not intervene in Mexican affairs without approval of her allies. No candidate should be named, giving Isabella II freedom to choose, and a Mexican delegation should travel to Spain, moreso if their choice was Luisa Fernanda, in which case they should allow her to marry a European prince.

Miraflores resigned after only one month as prime minister. Narváez replaced him but he also resigned after sixteen days. The reasons are debated, but Juan Valera y Alcalá-Galiano included Maria Christina's anger about her children by her second marriage to Fernando Muñoz not being considered for the throne of Mexico.

=== Abandonment ===
Course of the Mexican-American War

In May 1846, Britain and France were reported to be supportive of a Spanish monarch for Mexico, but Paredes conditioned the proclamation of the monarchy to a victory in the Mexican-American War. Defeats at Palo Alto and Resaca de la Palma convinced Paredes and Bermúdez de Castro that the opportunity was gone. On 6 June, Paredes addressed the newly elected congress and openly endorsed republicanism.

Bermúdez de Castro wrote an unsigned farewell article for El Tiempo, claiming that while the unnamed author still believed monarchy was convenient for Mexico, his patriotism forced him to stand with the republican government. The journal then shut down.

Despite the war taking attention from the monarchist project, it wasn't forgotten by supporters and opponents. Bermúdez de Castro claimed that a monarchist movement now existed where there was none, and that it would reignite with European intervention. This was also the opinion of Alamán and others. In July, a retired officer of the Spanish army, Francisco de Paula Enrile, was misidentified in Veracruz as the infante Enrique and caused a panic. In Matamoros, Zachary Taylor proclaimed: "I don't bring war. I don't come to invade the country; I come to your defense and ours, to stop the invasion that is being prepared by a foreign monarch; I come to join you so we don't allow the planting in the American continent of that pestilential seed of the monarchy." Juan Almonte, who had been appointed minister to France by Paredes, defected to Antonio López de Santa Anna in August and rose the alarm about a supposed 36,000 strong European army gathering in Cuba to install the monarchy in Mexico, but according to Bermúdez de Castro, nobody believed him.

Paredes resigned on 28 July and returned to the army. On 3 August, a coup arrested Paredes and deposed his successor Nicolás Bravo. The provisional president José Mariano Salas restored Mexico's federal system on 22 August.

== Postwar attempts ==
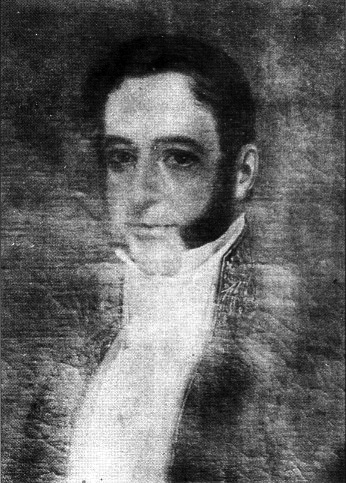
Agustín de Iturbide y Huarte

Independent of the Spanish, Gutiérrez de Estrada sounded the British and Austrian courts in July 1846, for support in installing a Mexican monarchy headed by a member of the House of Habsburg.

Defeat in the Mexican-American War contributed to a resurgence in monarchism, to the point that in correspondence between the liberals José María Luis Mora and Mariano Otero, Otero opined that the monarchists may have triumphed in Mexico if the monarchy had not been simultaneously overthrown in France in the Revolution of 1848, and returned political fashion back in favor of republicanism.

The role of El Tiempo was taken up by the newspaper El Universal, once again directed by Lucas Alamán. El Universal began publishing in Mexico City in November 1848. It featured many former contributors of El Tiempo and also Rafael de Rafael, Ignacio Aguilar y Marocho, José Dolores Ulibarri, and Father Manuel de San Juan Crisóstomo Nájera. Like El Tiempo, El Universal followed the tactic of implying that monarchy was the best form of government for Mexico rather than outright stating it. Its articles tended to criticize the federal organization of Mexico as established in the 1824 Constitution.

A political pamphlet surveying the various Mexican factions in 1851 recognized the monarchists, their ties to the Conservative Party, and the leadership of Lucas Alamán, but also dismissed their success as impossible due to the nearby example of a successful republic provided by the United States.

In 1853, a coup overthrew president Mariano Arista, and Lucas Alamán invited Antonio López de Santa Anna to assume the presidency, intending for him to hold power only until a foreign monarch was found. Alamán was made Secretary of Foreign Relations, and he revealed his monarchist project to the French minister Auguste Levasseur. The government contacted José María Gutiérrez de Estrada and granted him official diplomatic credentials, instructing him to look for a royal candidate in the courts of Britain, France, Austria, and Spain. Upon the suggestion of Estrada, another monarchist, José Manuel Hidalgo y Esnaurrízar was granted a diplomatic post in Spain in order to seek a Spanish candidate for the throne.

In 1855 a liberal coup deposed Santa Anna. Estrada and Hidalgo lost official government recognition, ending the official effort to seek a monarchy for Mexico. In the wake of controversies that arose in the subsequent, liberal administration of Juan Álvarez, Antonio de Haro y Tamariz plotted to restore the House of Iturbide to the Mexican throne, and if there was a refusal from the pretender Agustín Jerónimo de Iturbide y Huarte, Haro planned to assume the throne himself.

== French Intervention ==
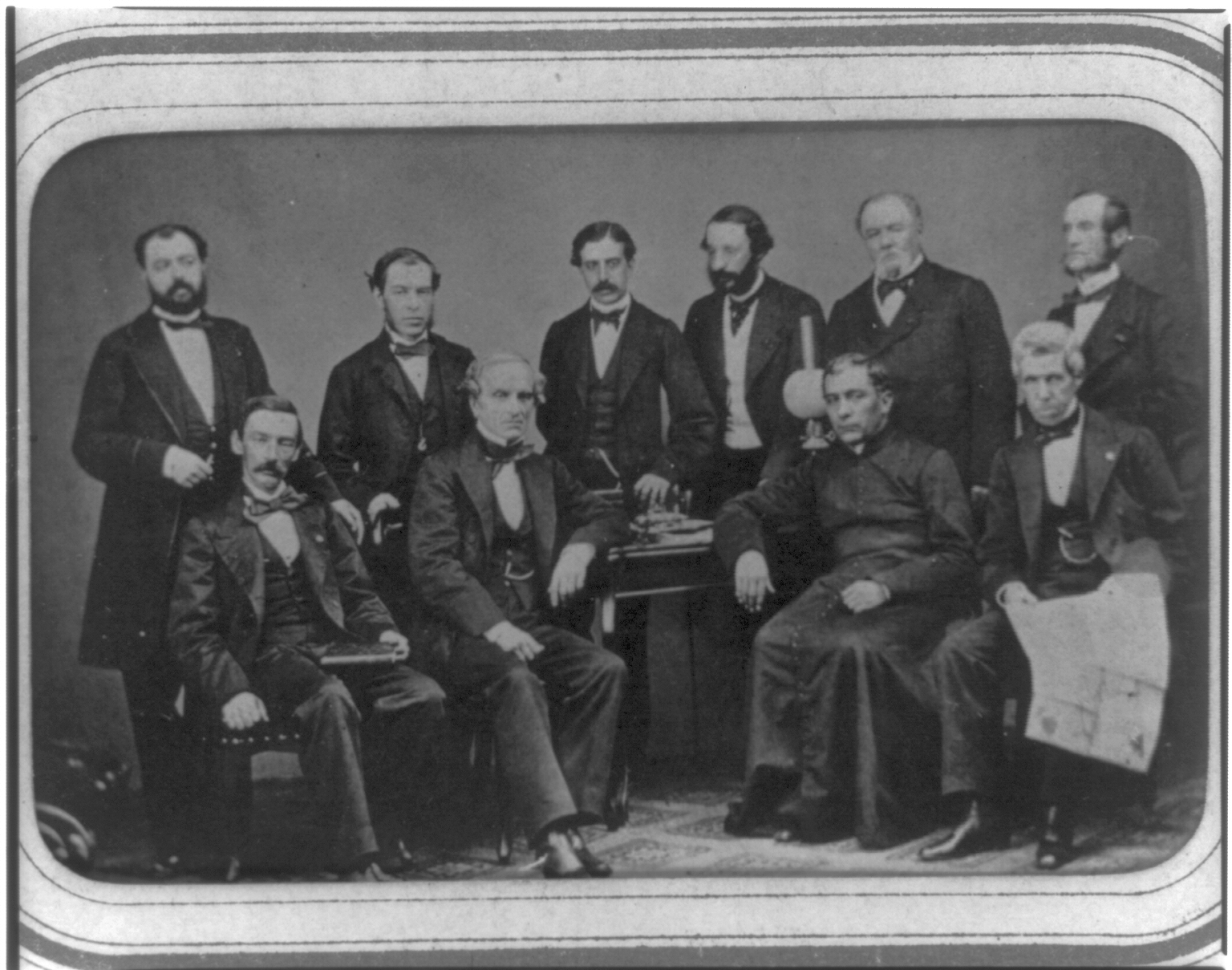
Mexican monarchist delegation: Back Row: José Hidalgo, Antonio Escandón, Ángel Domínguez, Antonio Peredo, Adrián Woll, Jose Maria de Landa. Front Row: Ignacio Marocho, José María Gutiérrez de Estrada, Francisco Morfi, Joaquín de León.

Estrada and Hidalgo continued their campaign for the establishment of a Mexican monarchy in spite of no longer having any government accreditation. Estrada met with Napoleon III in June 1857. Hidalgo regained an official diplomatic post with the Mexican government, but with no authority or instructions to pursue any monarchist project. The most important connection made by Hidalgo was Eugénie de Montijo, the Spanish wife of Napoleon III. At a meeting in Biarritz in August 1857 regarding Mexican-Spanish affairs, the empress expressed her opinion that the establishment of a monarchy could benefit Mexico. Hidalgo explained that such a project had been attempted in 1846 and in 1854. Montijo became enthusiastic about the idea of a Mexican monarchy, and began to lobby for the matter with her husband.

The Marquis de Radepont, while living in Mexico, became intrigued by the idea of a Mexican monarchy after hearing it from prominent Mexicans. He wrote an essay aimed at the French government explaining how this could come about with the support of France. He also argued that a Mexican monarchy could serve as a barrier to American expansion, comparing it to the Ottoman Empire acting as a barrier to Russian expansion in Europe.

The President of the Mexican Supreme Court Luis de la Rosa Oteiza expressed his support for a monarchy to the French minister to Mexico, Jean Gabriac, but he died in 1856.

Gutiérrez de Estrada and Hidalgo continued to lobby Napoleon III for a Mexican monarchy, but he replied in 1857 that he had no pretext to intervene and did not wish to antagonize the United States.

In December 1859, the liberal government of Mexico signed the McLane–Ocampo Treaty. If ratified by the United States Senate, the U.S. would have gained significant concessions including the perpetual right of transit across key routes in Mexico and the right to protect them with military force. Newspapers in Europe and the United States expressed astonishment at the magnitude of the concessions and opined that the treaty would turn Mexico into a U.S. protectorate. The treaty caused great concern in European courts, and was used by Mexican monarchists to emphasize the importance of European intervention in Mexico to defend against American encroachment. Ultimately no intervention in response to the treaty was necessary, as it was rejected by the American senate on 30 May 1860, due to tensions that would lead one year later to the outbreak of the American Civil War.

In July 1861, in response to a financial crisis, the Juárez government placed a moratorium on the payment of foreign debts and expelled all Spanish diplomats, whom Juárez accused of supporting the Conservatives in the Reform War. In response, Spain, France, and a reluctant United Kingdom signed the Convention of London, agreeing to joint military intervention to force Mexico to resume payments. Already in civil war, the United States were asked to join the Convention, but declined and declared neutrality. Napoleon III now had a pretext to intervene and a free hand to carry out the plans that had been laid out to him by Estrada, Hidalgo, and Radepont, as the wartorn United States would be unable to enforce the Monroe Doctrine.

The European expedition landed in Veracruz between December 1861 and January 1862. However, the leader of the expedition, Spanish general Juan Prim, was himself of liberal inclination and married to a Mexican woman with family ties to a member of Juárez's government. On 10 January Prim issued a manifesto in which he denied that the expedition had come to conquer or force a change of government in Mexico. When it became evident that this was the intention of the French, the Spanish and British agreed to retire their forces in return for 80% of custom revenues in Veracruz being used to settle debts. The French invasion of Mexico began in April 1862.

The Mexican conservative press began a campaign to promote monarchist ideals. It was argued that Mexico would not lose its independence, since in their understanding the French only intended regime change. The press also argued that an alliance with France would help Mexico withstand the encroachment of the United States. The international legal theories of Emer de Vattel and Fortunato de Felice were used to defend the legality and justification for the French intervention.

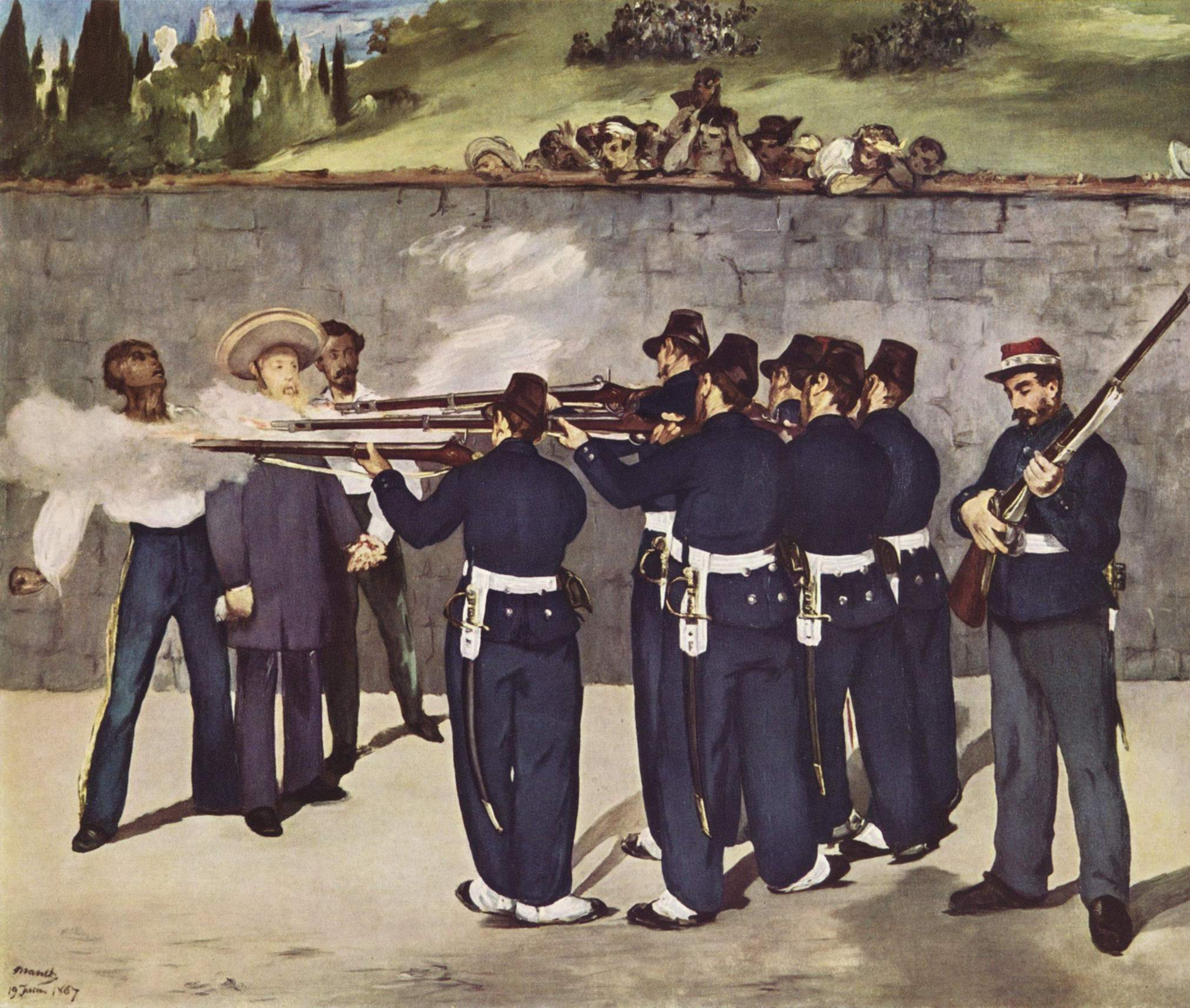
Execution of Emperor Maximilian by Édouard Manet

After the capital was taken, a new government was set up and resolved to invite Maximilian of Habsburg to be the emperor of Mexico. Maximilian accepted the crown in April 1864. While Maximilian was a well-intended reformer who did not fail to win Mexican supporters, his government lacked legitimacy and was engaged throughout its existence in warfare against supporters of the Mexican republic. The United States never recognized the Empire, and after the end of the Civil War, flooded Mexico with arms and volunteers and placed diplomatic pressure on France to leave the continent. The French acquiesced and began to leave in 1866. After the defeat of the empire, Maximilian and the leading monarchist generals Miguel Miramón and Tomás Mejía were executed in June 1867, putting an end to Mexican efforts at establishing a monarchical government.

== Contemporary monarchism ==
Today, some anti-republican and anti-liberal political groups advocate for the return of the Mexican monarchy and the legitimacy of the Second Mexican Empire, such as the far-right Nationalist Front of Mexico, established in 2006. They reportedly gather every year in Querétaro to commemorate the execution of Emperor Maximilian and his generals.

== See also ==
- First Mexican Empire
- Second Mexican Empire
- Mexican nobility
- Conservative Party (Mexico)
