= Conservative Party (Mexico) =

Defunct right-wing political party in Mexico (1849-67)

Conservative Party Partido Conservador
- Founder: Lucas Alamán
- Founded: 1849
- Dissolved: 1867
- Headquarters: Mexico City
- Ideology: Conservatism; Clericalism; Centralism; Hispanism; Corporatism; After 1863: Monarchism (Mexican)
- Political position: Right-wing
- Religion: Roman Catholicism
- Colors: Blue

The Conservative Party (Spanish: Partido Conservador) was a political faction in Mexico between 1830 and 1867, which became a loosely organized political party after 1849. They were opposed by, and fought several civil wars against, the Liberal Party.

At various times and under different circumstances they were known as escoceses, centralists, royalists, imperialists, or conservatives, but they tended to be united by the theme of preserving colonial Spanish values, while not being opposed to the economic development and modernization of the nation. Their base of support was the army, the hacendados, and the Catholic Church.

In the constitutional history of Mexico they supported the movement to have a centralized republic as opposed to a federal republic, and produced the Constitution of 1836 and the Constitution of 1843. Certain Conservative intellectuals supported a monarchy for Mexico but between the First Mexican Empire and the Second Mexican Empire such ideas were reduced to a fringe movement. By the time the French launched their invasion of Mexico in 1862, monarchism was insignificant and the French at first struggled to find supporters among the Conservatives in their aims to establish a monarchical client state. Many Conservatives were eventually won over only to be disillusioned with the liberal inclinations of Emperor Maximilian. With the fall of the Second Mexican Empire the conservatives suffered a decisive defeat, and the party ceased to exist.

== History ==
The Plan of Iguala was a triumph for conservative principles, and in fact a reaction against the Trienio liberal in Spain, but monarchism was largely discredited after the First Mexican Empire's fall in 1823. The conservatives suffered another setback with the triumph of federalism during the debates over the drafting of the Constitution of 1824. Their first candidate to reach the presidency was Anastasio Bustamante in 1830, but he both gained and lost the presidency through a coup as most other presidents did during the tumultuous era of the First Mexican Republic. A decade of conservative rule would be inaugurated in 1835 through the establishment of the Centralist Republic of Mexico, but the federalist constitution would be restored in 1846 after the start of the Mexican–American War. La Reforma, and the establishment of the Constitution of 1857 proved to be another triumph for liberal principles especially anti-clericalism, and conservatives lost the Reform War attempting to abolish the new constitution. During the Second French intervention, the conservatives would invite Maximilian of Habsburg, to assume the Mexican throne, but the Emperor proved to be a liberal, disillusioning many of his conservative supporters.

== Ideology ==
=== Centralism ===
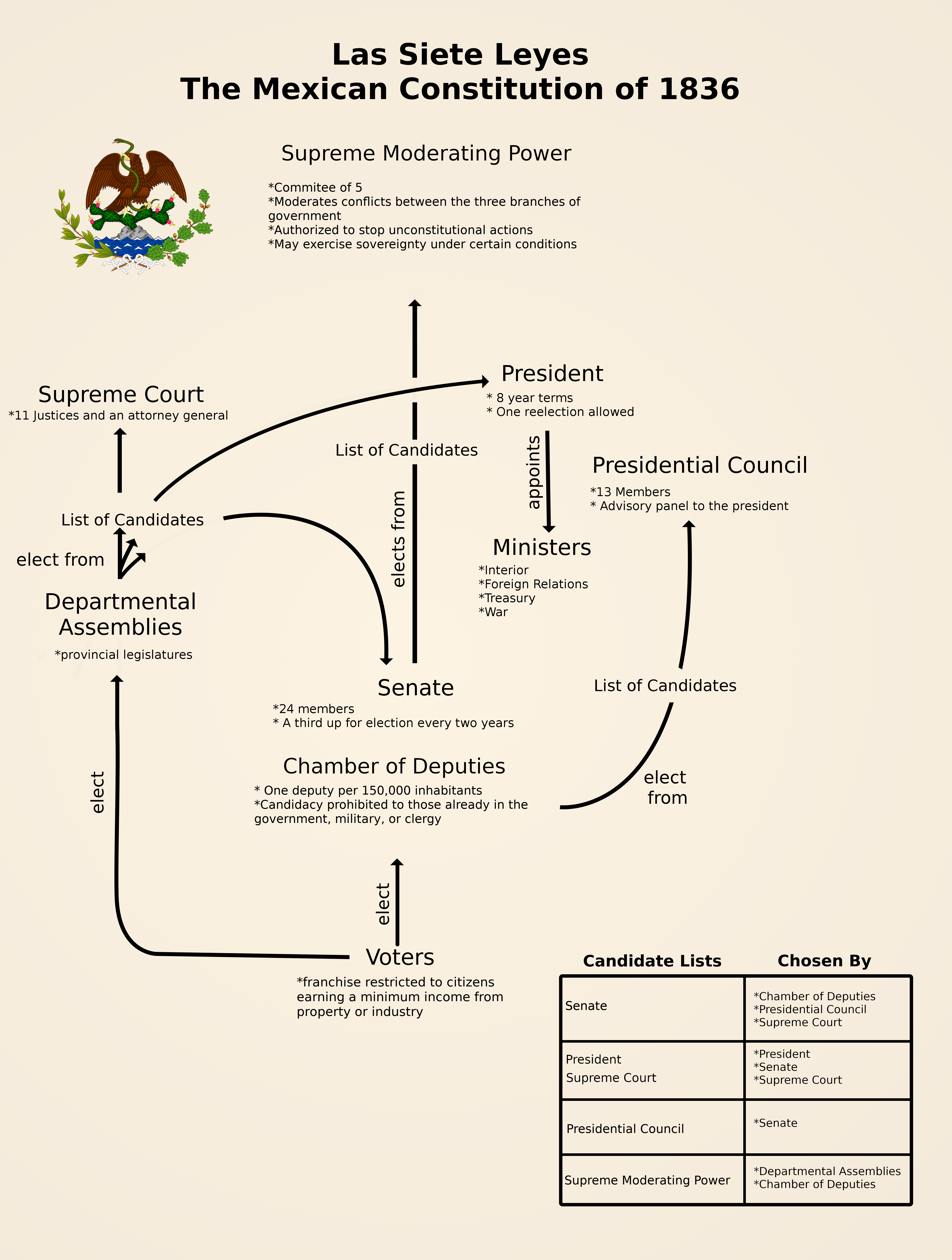
Diagram illustrating the Centralist government organized by the Siete Leyes

The liberal and conservative parties had not entirely coalesced at the time of the drafting of the Constitution of 1824, and yet the eventual Conservative cause of centralism was at the center of the debates. Ironically, a liberal, Father Mier would lay out the centralist arguments that would eventually form one of the core Conservative principles. Mier argued that the nation needed a strong centralized government to guard against Spanish attempts to reconquer her former colony, and that a federation rather suited a situation in which previously sovereign states were attempting to unite as had happened with the United States. New Spain had never been made up of autonomous provinces. Federation for Mexico, according to Mier would then be an act of separation rather than unification and only lead to internal conflict. The arguments for federation prevailed however, motivated by the long struggle for independence to seek as much autonomy as possible, and an eagerness to reap the salaries that would accompany local bureaucracies.

Conservatives would finally be able to discard the Constitution of 1824 after the overthrow of the liberal presidency of Valentín Gómez Farías in 1832. A newly elected conservative congress began work on a new constitution that would eventually come to be known as the Siete Leyes, which replaced the Mexican states with departments, inaugurating the Centralist Republic of Mexico. The governors of the departments were to be appointed by the central government from among candidates nominated by departmental assemblies.

Another Conservative constitution would be inaugurated in 1843 through the Bases Orgánicas, which continued the departmental system. The departmental governors were once again appointed by the central government from nominees submitted by the departmental assemblies.

=== Clericalism ===
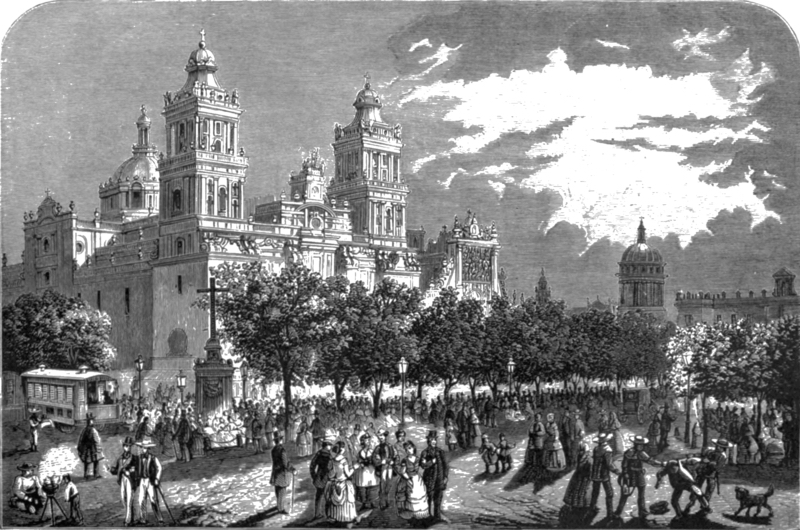
The Mexico City Metropolitan Cathedral

Mexico through the Plan of Iguala, gained its independence as a Catholic confessional state, and even the liberal Constitution of 1824 declared the Roman Catholic religion the sole legally permitted religion.

The liberal presidency of Valentín Gómez Farías began a series of anti-clerical measures as early as 1834. The government shut down church schools, assumed the right to make clerical appointments to the church, and shut down monasteries. It was at this point that the government began proposing the nationalization of church lands as well. Conservative backlash led to the fall of the Gómez Farías administration.

The issue of nationalizing church lands was brought up again by Gómez Farías once more who had once again found himself in the presidency during the Mexican–American War. This time Gómez Farías urged the nationalization of church lands as a means of funding the war effort, but the efficacy and prudence of such a measure was questioned by Conservatives, even by moderate liberals. There were clashes in the cabinet over the matter, and another Conservative revolt known as the Revolt of the Polkos once again toppled Gómez Farías.

A final and ill-fated Conservative effort to fight back against the anti-clerical measures of the Liberal Party took place during the pivotal La Reforma period which was inaugurated by the Plan of Ayutla that brought the liberal Juan Álvarez to power. This time it was not only the nationalization of church lands, but the question of religious freedom, and the jurisdiction of canon law over clergy that was brought to fore during the discussions regarding the drafting of the Constitution of 1857. Jose Julian Tornel wrote a pamphlet defending the Catholic Church's management of property and finances against advocates of disestablishment, warning that the private market in both fields would be much less generous to the public. Opponents of religious freedom argued that it would undermine national cohesion. In the end however, the liberal measures triumphed, church properties not related to religious functions were nationalized, priests remained under the jurisdiction of canon law only in non-civil cases, and for the first time a Mexican Constitution did not declare Catholicism as the state religion.

Conservative backlash would trigger the Reform War, and it was during the war that the liberal president Benito Juárez went much further than the earlier reform measures by nationalizing all the remaining church properties in order to fund the war effort. The Conservatives would eventually lose the war in 1860, and the liberal separation of church and state remained entrenched.

=== The Military ‘Fuero’ ===
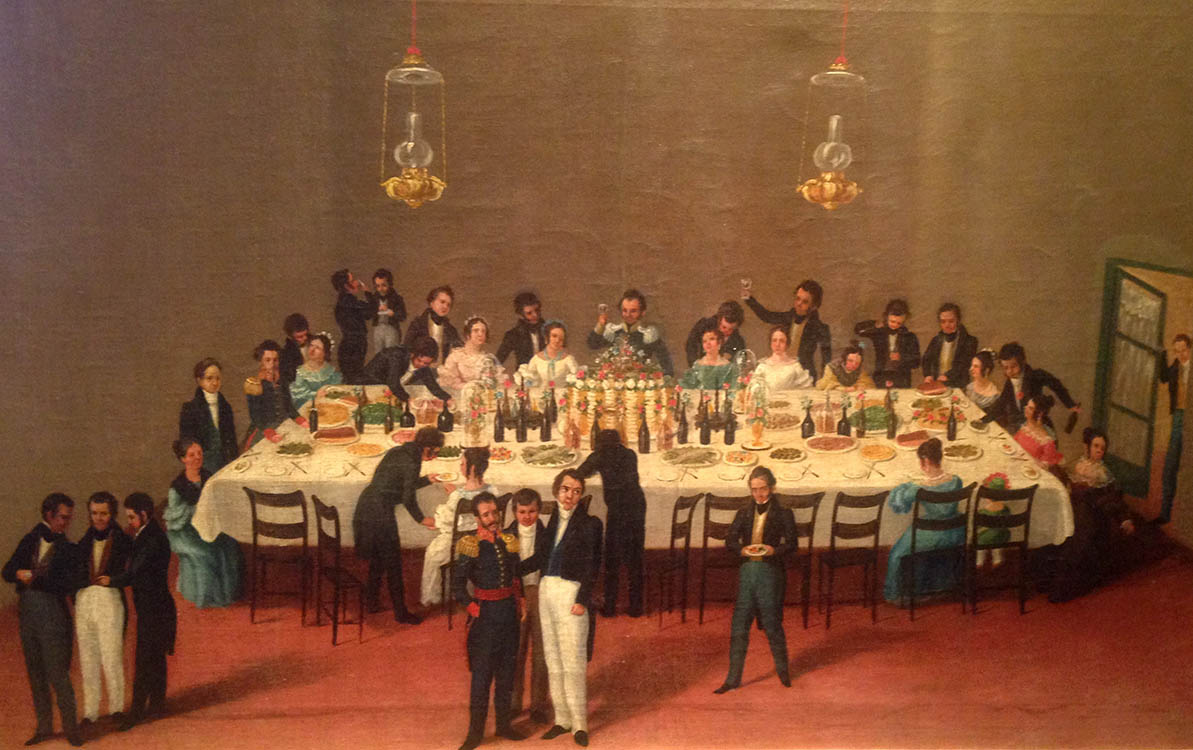
Mexican military banquet in 1844.

In the Hispanic legal tradition, a fuero is a legal privilege in general and even in contemporary times it is still the term used to refer to legal immunity enjoyed by legislators and other statesmen. The fuero of the Conservative slogan ‘religion y fueros’ referred to a specific legal military privilege that amounted to a separate legal system for Mexican soldiers.

The fuero system in Mexico dated back to the colonial era, and historian Lyle McAlister writes that “the [fuero] rendered [the army] virtually immune from civil authority”.

The efforts of the liberal president Valentín Gómez Farías to abolish the fuero a system contributed to the uprisings against his government.

In 1852, under the Conservative presidency of Santa Anna, there were some efforts to moderately reform the fuero system. Under Minister of War, and future Conservative president of Mexico, Manuel Robles Pezuela, there were discussions to confine the fuero to military related criminal matters.

Liberal efforts to abolish the fuero system through the Ley Juárez later integrated into the Constitution of 1857, further inflamed Conservative opposition and eventually helped trigger the Reform War, which the Conservatives ended up losing, effectively putting the matter to rest.

=== Corporatism ===
Corporatism is the principle that the legislative power of a nation ought to include representatives from bodies or corporations of various segments or classes in society.

The Constitution of 1843, formally known as the Bases Orgánicas took into account such principles, because while it established a chamber of deputies representing geographic districts, it also established a senate “composed of 63 members, one third from the industrial classes, including merchants”

When the Conservative Mariano Paredes overthrew the liberal president José Joaquín de Herrera at the end of 1845, he arranged for a new congress to be elected also taking into account corporatist principles. “Congress was to be composed of 160 deputies, representing the following nine classes, namely: real estate owners and agriculturists; merchants; miners; manufacturers; literary professions; magistracy; public functionaries; clergy; and the army.”

=== Monarchism ===
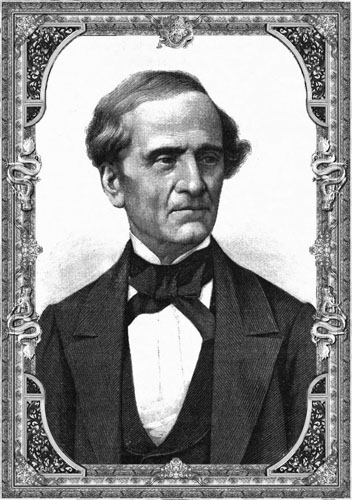
José María Gutiérrez de Estrada who in 1840 was forced to flee Mexico after provoking widespread outrage for advocating the establishment of a monarchy.

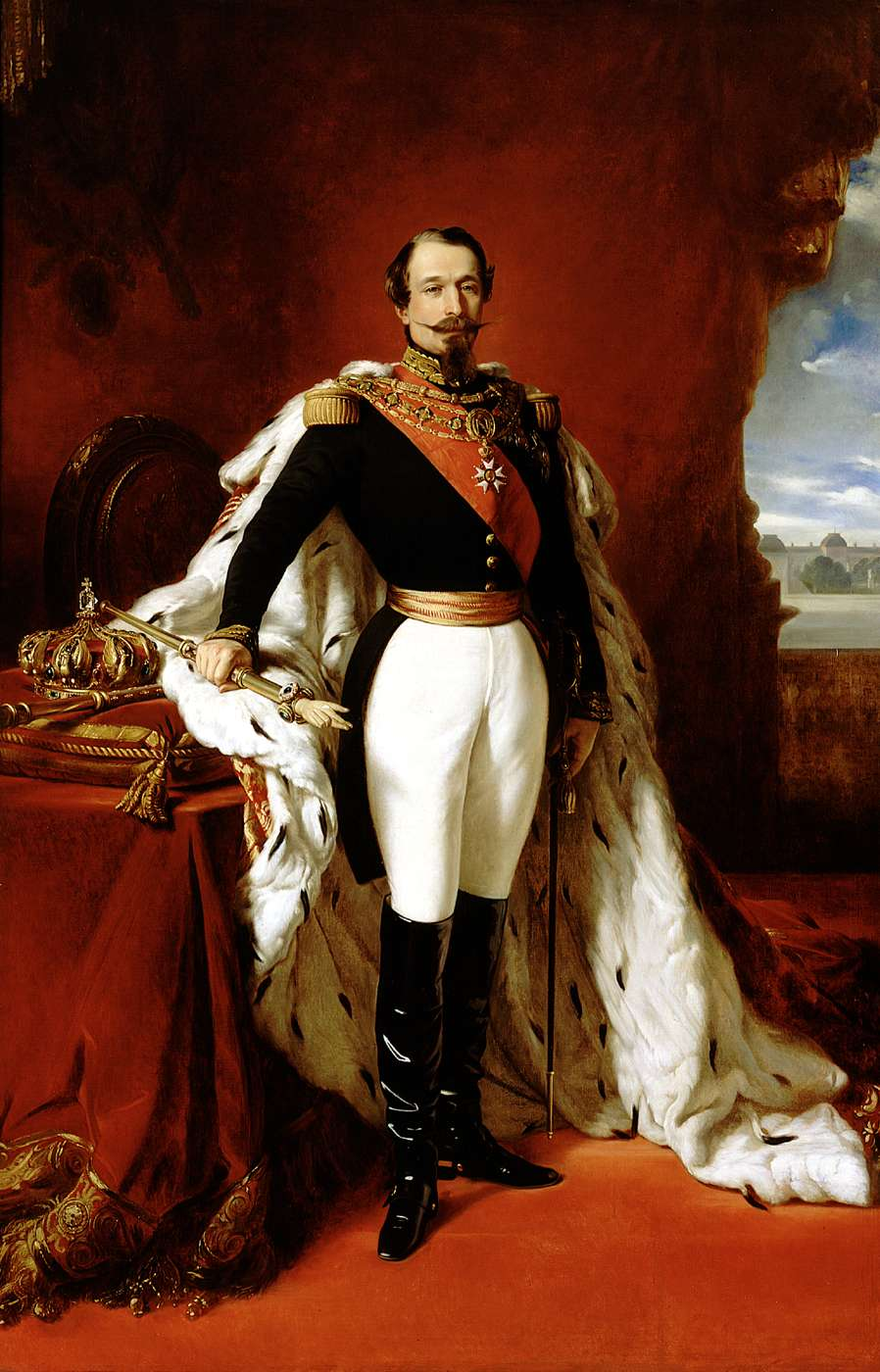
Napoleon III at whose instigation the Conservative Party finally gained widespread support for monarchism.

Certain conservative intellectuals would support the establishment of a monarchy, and the Conservative Party would eventually collaborate with the French to establish the Second Mexican Empire. However, after the fall of the First Mexican Empire, Mexican monarchism was reduced to a fringe movement. A Conservative government was in power when José María Gutiérrez de Estrada published his monarchist essay in 1840, indeed it was directly addressed to President Anastasio Bustamante, but in response to its publication Estrada found himself facing backlash from both Conservative and Liberal parties, accusations of sedition, and was forced to flee the nation.

In December 1845, the Conservative general Mariano Paredes published a pronunciamiento against the liberal government of the liberal president José Joaquín de Herrera, ostensibly because the president intended to recognize the independence of Texas, but the pronunciamiento was also publicly perceived as containing monarchist sympathies. Herrera was overthrown and Paredes became president. As the new government announced a plan for constitutional reform, the press began to attack monarchism. The Conservative statesman Antonio Haro y Tamariz joined such critical voices, expressing skepticism that monarchy was the best form of government for Mexico and pointing out that monarchies are typically supported by a nobility and that there was no nobility in Mexico, sarcastically suggesting that the government start granting titles to generals. The nonexistence of a Mexican nobility, as an obstacle to monarchy, was also pointed out by the liberal press at the time. Ironically, Haro himself would later join a monarchist scheme that never got past the planning stages in 1856. Meanwhile, in April, 1846 the Mexican-American War broke out. Paredes would eventually later declare his loyalty to the republican system for the time being and shifted his focus to the war effort.

The overthrow of the liberal president Mariano Arista in 1850 brought the monarchist statesman Lucas Alamán to the position of Foreign Minister, serving under the Conservative presidency of a restored Santa Anna. The Mexican government now began official efforts at seeking a European candidate for a Mexican throne. Alaman kept his efforts secret from the public and from most of his fellow ministers. The project was completely ended when Santa Anna was overthrown by the liberal Plan of Ayutla in 1855. The monarchical project had been dealt an earlier blow when Alaman himself had died in 1853.

By 1861, when Napoleon III began the Second French intervention in Mexico with the intention of overthrowing the government of the Mexican Republic and replacing it with a French-aligned monarchy, he found that monarchism no longer existed even among the Conservatives. The idea of a Mexican monarchy had reached Napoleon through certain Mexican monarchist expatriates, but most of them had been living in Paris for a significant amount of time and lacked awareness of true state of Mexican affairs. After the French invasion began, leading Conservative José Maria Cobos published a manifesto arguing that ‘no one’ supported a ‘foreign monarchy’. Conservative ex-president Miguel Miramón also opined that there was no monarchical party in Mexico. During this time, the official Conservative Party newspaper also endorsed republicanism.

The Spanish commander Juan Prim who had already backed out of France's intervention noted the Mexican opposition faced by the French, arguing that “if the reactionary party wants to fight the French who intend to come to their country with the flag of monarchy, who remains in Mexico with monarchical ideas?”. On July 22, 1862 Charles de Lorencez, then head of the French occupying forces, in a report to the French government wrote that "Nobody here wants a monarchy, not even the reactionaries."

Some Conservatives had sought French intervention, but only to provide military aid in the aftermath of losing the Reform War, without any attempt to replace the Mexican Republic with a monarchy. Historian Hubert Howe Bancroft writes that “at first they only hoped for aid to restore their strength, without any thought of the European powers entertaining the idea of a monarchy in Mexico. The thought was, most probably, put into their heads by Napoleon III.” Mexican minister to the United States at the time, Matías Romero opined that the Conservatives never would have considered a monarchy "if they had not received, directly or indirectly, the indication of proposing it from the French government." Mexican historian Francisco Bulnes has concluded that Napoleon made military intervention in favor of the Conservatives conditional upon accepting monarchy. Eventually Conservatives would begin to join the French and the aforementioned ex-president Miramon would even die alongside Emperor Maximilian when he was executed after the fall of the Second Mexican Empire.

== Conservatives ==
=== Presidents ===
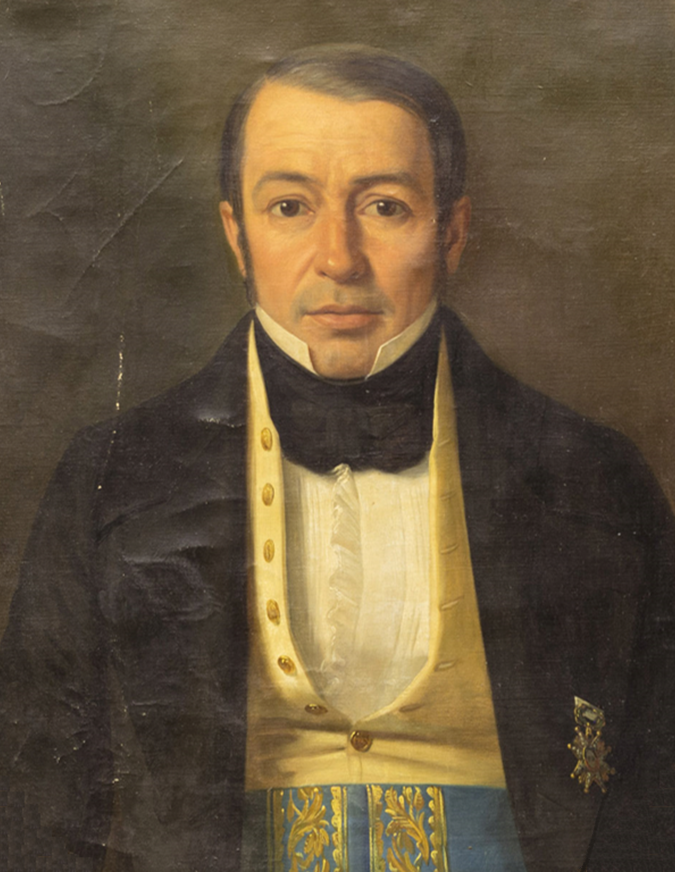
Mariano Paredes

- Anastasio Bustamante He was the first conservative president of Mexico, and the leading minister of his first administration was the conservative intellectual Lucas Alamán. During his later rule in the Centralist Republic he nonetheless rejected José María Gutiérrez de Estrada’s pleas in 1840 to establish a monarchical government, and also wavered a bit from conservative principles when during a coup attempt in 1842, he offered to restore the federal system.
- Antonio López de Santa Anna While known for repeatedly switching sides, he did have his periods of conservative rule. His overthrow of the liberal Valentín Gómez Farías led to the end of the First Mexican Republic and the establishment of the Centralist Republic of Mexico. His last dictatorship from 1852 to 1853 was also conservative and included official efforts led by Lucas Alamán to seek a foreign monarch for Mexico.
- José Justo Corro He oversaw the publication of the Siete Leyes and was a devout Catholic who succeeded in establishing diplomatic relations with the Holy See.
- Nicolás Bravo He tried to overthrow the liberal administration of Vicente Guerrero and then served as interim president at times during the Centralist Republic.
- Francisco Javier Echeverría He came from a business background and believed in centralism as making for more effective fiscal policy.
- José Mariano Salas Overthrew the conservative administration of Mariano Paredes and reestablished the federalist constitution of 1824, yet nonetheless sided with the conservatives during the Reform War and was elected regent during the Second Mexican Empire.
- Mariano Paredes A military man with aristocratic views, he was one of the very few Mexican presidents to ever express official interest in setting up a monarchy in the country.
- Valentín Canalizo A puppet ruler for Santa Anna during the Centralist Republic, he later abandoned conservative principles when he served as Minister of War under the liberal President Valentín Gómez Farías and supported the administration's aims at nationalizing church property.
- Félix María Zuloaga Overthrew the progressive government of Ignacio Comonfort after the latter had overseen the ratification of the many measures of La Reforma which included a series of anti-clerical laws. He restored the previous legal rights that the church and the army enjoyed and promised to return the church lands that had been nationalized. He then led the conservatives through the first year of the Reform War.
- Manuel Robles Pezuela A moderate who overthrew the government of Félix Zuloaga in an attempt to end the war through diplomacy and compromise with the liberals.
- Miguel Miramón A clerical general who played a role in the early revolts against La Reforma before winning a series of important victories during the first year of the Reform War. During the war, Miramon ascended to the presidency and would continue to lead the conservatives until they lost the war in 1860. He went into exile and returned to the country during the Second Mexican Empire, but the liberal Emperor Maximilian sent him again out of the country to diffuse conservative opposition to his rule. As the Empire began to fall Miramon returned to offer his services. After the triumph of the liberals he was executed by firing squad next to the Emperor, and his fellow conservative general Tomás Mejía.

=== Clergy ===
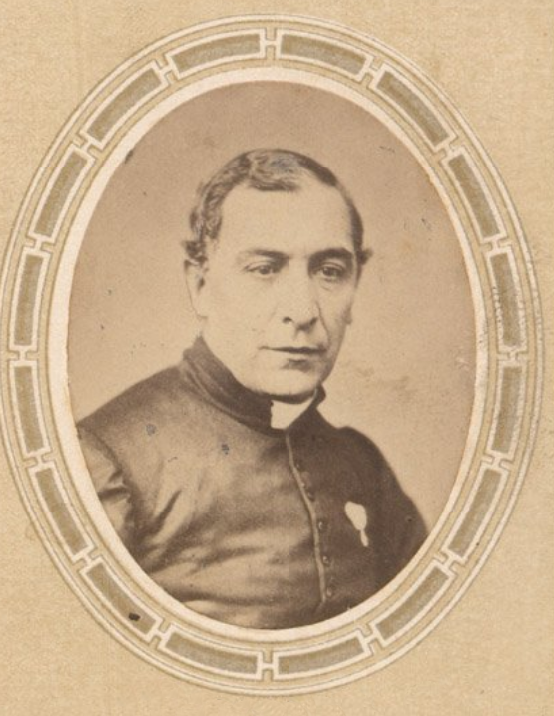
Father Francisco Javier Miranda

- Archbishop Antonio de Labastida the Archbishop of Mexico and a staunch opponent of La Reforma which sought to nationalize church properties. He was a member of the Regency of the Mexican Empire during the Second Mexican Empire.
- Father Francisco Javier Miranda – one of the leaders of the reaction against La Reforma. He found himself exiled during the liberal presidency of Juan Álvarez but came back disguised and became one of president Ignacio Comonfort’s fiercest enemies. Miranda led one of the conservative revolts in the initial stages of the Reform War. During the period of the Second Mexican Empire, he would form part of the commission that travelled to Europe to offer the crown of Mexico the Maximilian of Habsburg.
- José Sebastián Segura priest, mining engineer, translator, poet, and conservative writer.
- Manuel de San Juan Crisóstomo Nájera priest, linguist of Mexico's native languages, and educator who also contributed to Lucas Alamán's monarchist newspapers El Tiempo and El Universal. After Nájera's death, Alamán would write a biographical essay on him.
- Basilio Arrillaga Jesuit priest, deputy to the Spanish Cortes, deputy to the Mexican congress, and rector of the Colegio Carolino in Puebla. He was a staunch opponent of anti-clericalism.
- José Mariano Dávila y Arrillaga physician, priest, and historian of the Jesuits.

=== Statesmen ===
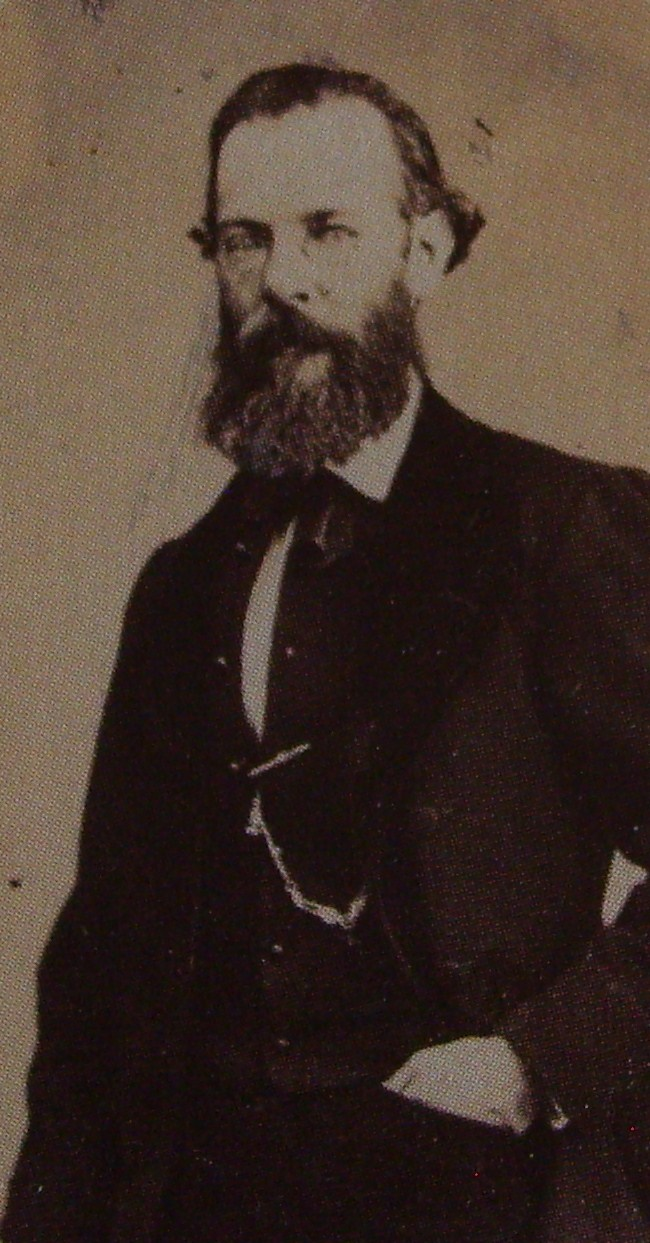
Rafael Martínez de la Torre

- Manuel Diez de Bonilla Was the Mexican minister plenipotentiary to the Holy See and to Colombia in the 1830s. He contributed to Lucas Alamán's first monarchist newspaper, El Tiempo and supported the conservatives during the Reform War.
- Jose Hidalgo Monarchist diplomat who along with José María Gutiérrez de Estrada sought to find support in Europe for the establishment of a monarchy in Mexico. He formed a part of the commission which traveled to Europe to invite Maximilian to accept the Mexican throne. After the fall of the Second Mexican Empire, he lived in Paris writing novels and a book reflecting on the Mexican monarchical experiment.
- Rafael Martínez de la Torre conservative lawyer, regidor of the Mexico City ayuntamiento, and deputy to congress who defended Emperor Maximilian during his trial after the emperor was captured by the liberal government.
- José Bernardo Couto congressional deputy, member of the council of state, and jurist who sided with the conservatives once the War of Reform broke out.
- Joaquín Velázquez de León coming from a mining background, de Leon was a minister under Santa Anna's last dictatorship, and later became a supporter and minister of the Second Mexican Empire. He was among the men who took part in the commission that travelled to Miramare Castle in order to offer the crown of Mexico to Maximilian of Habsburg.
- José Hilario Elguero y Guisasola Was minister of government under President Félix María Zuloaga as a member of the Junta Superior which organized the Second Mexican Empire.
- Carlos María de Bustamante Activist for Mexican Independence who later became an advocate of centralism and served as a member in the Supremo Poder Conservador. Nonetheless, openly opposed monarchy in the wake of the publication of José María Gutiérrez de Estrada's essay advocating for such a government in 1840.
- José Hipólito Odoardo A prosecutor for the Real Audiencia of Mexico under Spain who later served as president of the newly established Mexican congress. He was also a Bourbonist, a monarchist during the initial stages of Mexican Independence, who advocated for a member of the Spanish Royal Family to assume a newly established Mexican throne.
- Tomás Murphy y Alegría A Veracruz-born merchant, secretary of commerce, and minister plenipotentiary to Austria who supported the conservatives and later the Second Mexican Empire and considered the liberals to be tools of the United States.
- Crispiniano del Castillo Senator, jurist, and supporter of the Second Mexican Empire.

=== Military ===
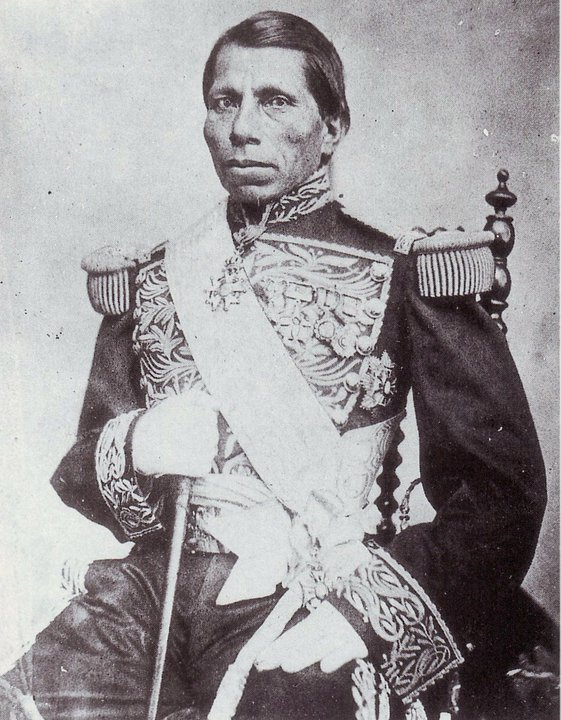
Tomás Mejía

- Tomás Mejía Clerical general and a member of the Otomi people, who supported the conservatives during the Reform War and later the Second Mexican Empire. After the triumph of the liberals he was executed by firing squad next to the Emperor, and his fellow conservative general Miguel Miramón.
- Luis G. Osollo A leading conservative general during the Reform War. He died of typhoid fever before the war had ended.
- Leonardo Márquez Supported the conservatives during the Reform War and remained at large even after the liberals had won the war. He succeeded in assassinating the liberal statesman Melchor Ocampo and then killed the leading liberal general Santos Degollado who had been sent after Marquez in response. He later supported the Second Mexican Empire and escaped when the Empire fell eventually becoming one of the longest lived imperialists, dying in the early 20th century and having written works defending the Empire and his role within it.
- Joaquin Orihuela led one of the conservative revolts in the initial stages of the Reform War
- Refugio Tánori - Sonoran Opata chieftain who was a zealous supporter of the Second Mexican Empire. He was captured by liberal forces and executed, proclaiming his loyalty to Emperor Maximilian before the firing squad.
- Antonio de Haro y Tamariz Conservative general who later led some of the early revolts against La Reforma.
- Adrián Woll A Franco-Mexican and former Napoleonic soldier who fought for Mexican Independence as a mercenary and then remained in the country. He joined the Mexican military and served as governor of Tamaulipas. He fought on the side of the conservatives during the Reform War and he supported the Second Mexican Empire, being amongst the delegates who travelled to Miramare Castle in order to offer the crown of Mexico to Maximilian of Habsburg.
- Juan Almonte Son of Independence War Hero Jose Maria Morelos, veteran of Mexico's many early conflicts including the Texas Revolution during which he was present at the Battle of the Alamo. He was initially staunchly opposed to monarchy when José María Gutiérrez de Estrada published his monarchist essay in 1840, but later became one of the key figures in the establishment of the Second Mexican Empire.

=== Writers ===
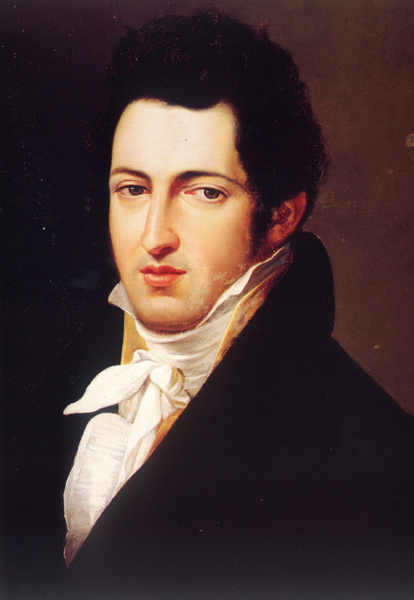
Lucas Alamán

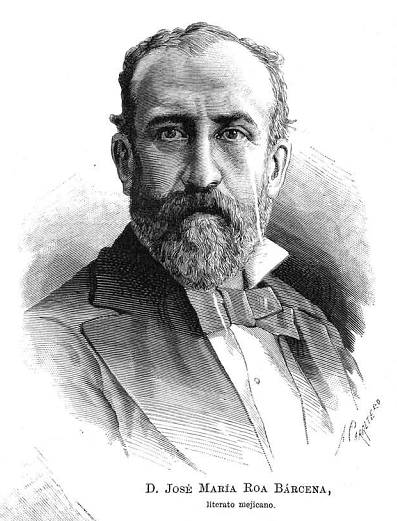
José María Roa Bárcena

- Lucas Alamán Writer, historian, scientist, businessman, and statesman, Alaman was the preeminent conservative Mexican intellectual up until his death in 1853. He served as a minister within multiple conservative administrations. He wrote a four volume history of Mexico and edited newspapers advocating for the establishment of a monarchy in Mexico.
- Francisco de Paula Arrangoiz Leading monarchist and historian who played a role in the establishment of the Second Mexican Empire even serving as a foreign minister under it and later grew disillusioned with Emperor Maximilian's liberal views. Arrangoiz also wrote a history of Mexico which covered the period from the start of the Mexican War of Independence to the fall of the Second Mexican Empire.
- Ignacio Águilar y Marocho Conservative journalist who also formed a part of the commission which traveled to Miramare Castle to invite Maximilian to accept the Mexican throne.
- Rafael Rafael He was one of the publishers of El Universal, a newspaper edited by Lucas Alaman in the 1850s advocating for the establishment of a monarchy in Mexico.
- José Julián Tornel, brother of General José María Tornel, who wrote a pamphlet during La Reforma, defending the Catholic Church's management of property and finances against advocates of disestablishment, warning that the private market in both fields would be much less generous to the public.
- Faustino Galicia Chimalpopoca lawyer and Nahuatl scholar, who defended the importance of religion in Mexican life, litigated in favor of Mexico's indigenous communities against the liberal reform laws, and became one of Emperor Maximilian's inner circle, serving as his interpreter and tutor in the Nahuatl language.
- Teodosio Lares Lawyer who played governing roles in Santa Anna's last dictatorship and during the Second Mexican Empire. He was a member of the Junta Superior which organized the Second Mexican Empire. He was also the Minister of Justice and President of the Council of Ministers during this time. As the Empire began to falter he voted against Maximilian's abdication during the council of Orizaba. He published books on pedagogy and psychology.
- Alejandro Arango y Escandón Lawyer, poet, librarian and director of the Mexican Academy of Language. He was part of the Assembly of Notables which organized the Empire and later formed a part of the consultative committee on financial affairs for the Empire. Founded La Sociedad Católica a Catholic lay organization in 1868.
- José María Roa Bárcena Poet, novelist, and historian who supported the Second Mexican Empire formed part of the Assembly of Notables and later grew disillusioned with Emperor Maximilian's liberal inclinations.
- Francisco Manuel Sánchez de Tagle Poet and statesman who wrote for Lucas Alaman's first monarchist newspaper El Tiempo. During the constitutional convention that oversaw the transition of the nation to the Centralist Republic of Mexico he advocated the establishment of a fourth branch of government, the Supreme Moderating Power, an idea which eventually would be integrated into the Siete Leyes. He contributed to Lucas Alamán's first monarchist newspaper, El Tiempo.
- Vicente Segura Arguelles Conservative journalist and editor who supporter the conservatives during the War of Reform and was executed by the triumphant liberal armies.
- José Joaquín Pesado Writer, journalist, poet, and professor of philosophy.
- Manuel Carpio Poet, philosopher, writer, physician who also served as a local deputy for the conservatives in the Vera Cruz legislature.
- José María Gutiérrez de Estrada A Yucatecan landowner who in 1840 after the Federalist Revolt of 1840 led to devastating fighting at the capital, published an essay arguing that after two decades of chaos, the Republic had failed and that Mexico ought to seek to invite a European prince to found a Mexican monarchy. He was among the delegates who travelled to Miramare Castle in order to offer the crown of Mexico to Maximilian of Habsburg in 1864.
- José Miguel Guridi y Alcocer Philosopher, theologian, poet, and writer who was also a Bourbonist, a monarchist during the initial stages of Mexican Independence, who advocated for a member of the Spanish Royal Family to assume a newly established Mexican throne. Later he became an advocate of centralism.
- José Dolores Ulibarri one of the editors of Lucas Alamán's first monarchist newspaper, El Tiempo.

== See also ==
- National Action Party (Mexico)
