= Nationalist Front =

Nationalist Front may refer to:

- Nationalist Front (Germany) − neo-Nazi group in Germany
- Nationalist Front (United States) − neo-Nazi group in the United States
- Nationalist Front of Mexico − far-right nationalist group in Mexico
