= José María Gutiérrez de Estrada =

Mexican diplomat

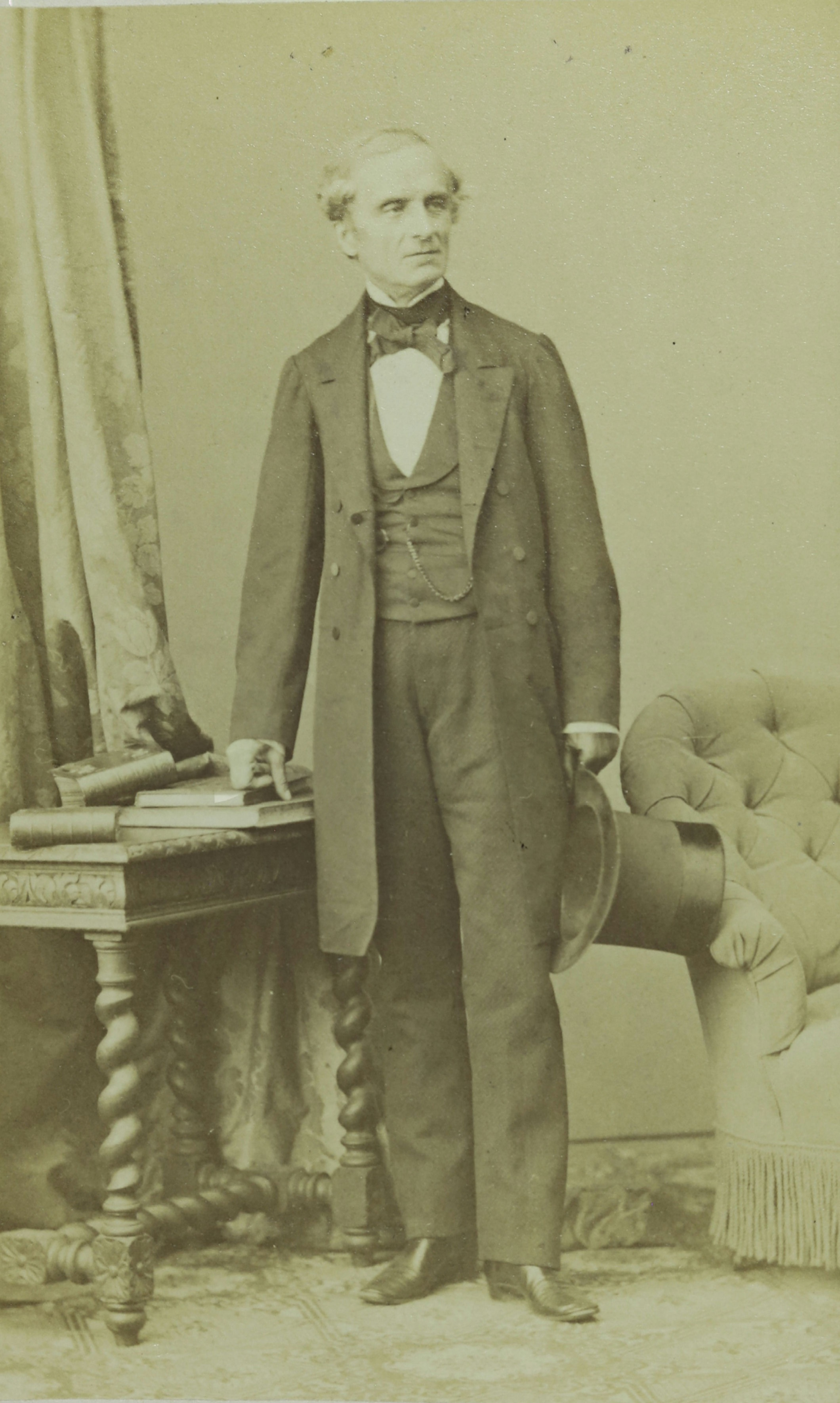

Minister of Interior and Exterior Relations
- In office 23 January 1835 – 1 June 1835
- President: Antonio López de Santa Anna; Miguel Barragán
- Preceded by: Francisco María Lombardo
- Succeeded by: José María Ortiz Monasterio

Personal details
- Born: 17 October 1800 San Francisco de Campeche, New Spain
- Died: 17 May 1867 (aged 66) Paris, France
- Party: Conservative

José María Gutiérrez de Estrada (17 October 1800 – 17 May 1867), was a Mexican conservative diplomat, minister, and senator. He came from the state of Yucatán, where his brother, Joaquín Gutiérrez de Estrada, also a conservative politician, would go on to become governor.

Estrada was one of the most prominent Mexican monarchists having written an essay advocating such a government in 1840. Almost two decades later in 1863, he headed the delegation that offered the Mexican throne to Maximilian of Habsburg at Miramare Castle.

== Youth and early political career ==
José María Gutiérrez was born on October 17, 1800, to a wealthy Yucatecan family which allowed him to receive a formal education in Mexico City. At the age of twenty eight, he was sent by president Guadalupe Victoria on a diplomatic mission, serving under the Ministry of Foreign relations headed by Lucas Alamán. He was given the responsibility of delivering the signatures to the treaty of friendship, commerce, and navigation between the newly established Mexican Republic and Holland. He would turn in his report on the matter to Foreign Minister José María Bocanegra in 1829.

At this time he also married to the sister of José Justo Gómez de la Cortina, thus uniting two families of great wealth.

In 1831, he was elected senator for the state of Yucatan and as he belonged to the Conservative Party he gained the enmity of congressional Liberals, particularly Manuel Crescencio García Rejón. Owing to his politics, in 1833 he was among those exiled by the liberal president Valentín Gómez Farías.

He gained certain fame for his literary talents, a fame which was promoted by the friends he made in Mexico, and through the connections he made through his wife's family, which played an important role in the cultural life of Mexico in the first half of the nineteenth century. These connections helped him be named the Minister of Foreign relations, by president Santa Anna in 1835, a position which would prove to be the height of his political career.

== Foreign minister ==
Estrada sought to conlidate Mexico's foreign relations among the nations of Europe. By the time he was appointed minister, Mexico had only attained recognition on the American continent from the United States and Peru and in Europe from England, Holland, France, Prussia and the Holy See. He aimed at establishing relations with Spain which had yet to recognize the independence of Mexico. He also sought to reestablish relations with the nations of Central America which had been shaken by the sovereign dispute over Chiapas. His term as foreign minister ended in July, 1836.

He then traveled to Europe on his own account, and while in Madrid was designated Mexican ambassador to Great Britain, and tasked with lobbying against recognition of Texan independence and for British opposition to the American annexation of such. Regardless, he was never able to assume the role due to the tumultuous political situation in Mexico which was leading to rapid ministerial turnaround. He returned to Mexico in 1840 only to witness the Federalist Revolt of 1840 in which President Anastasio Bustamante was taken hostage in his residence by rebels. The crisis resulted in a week of devastating fighting in the capital, a refugee exodus out of the city, and notable damage to the National Palace.

== Monarchist Essay ==
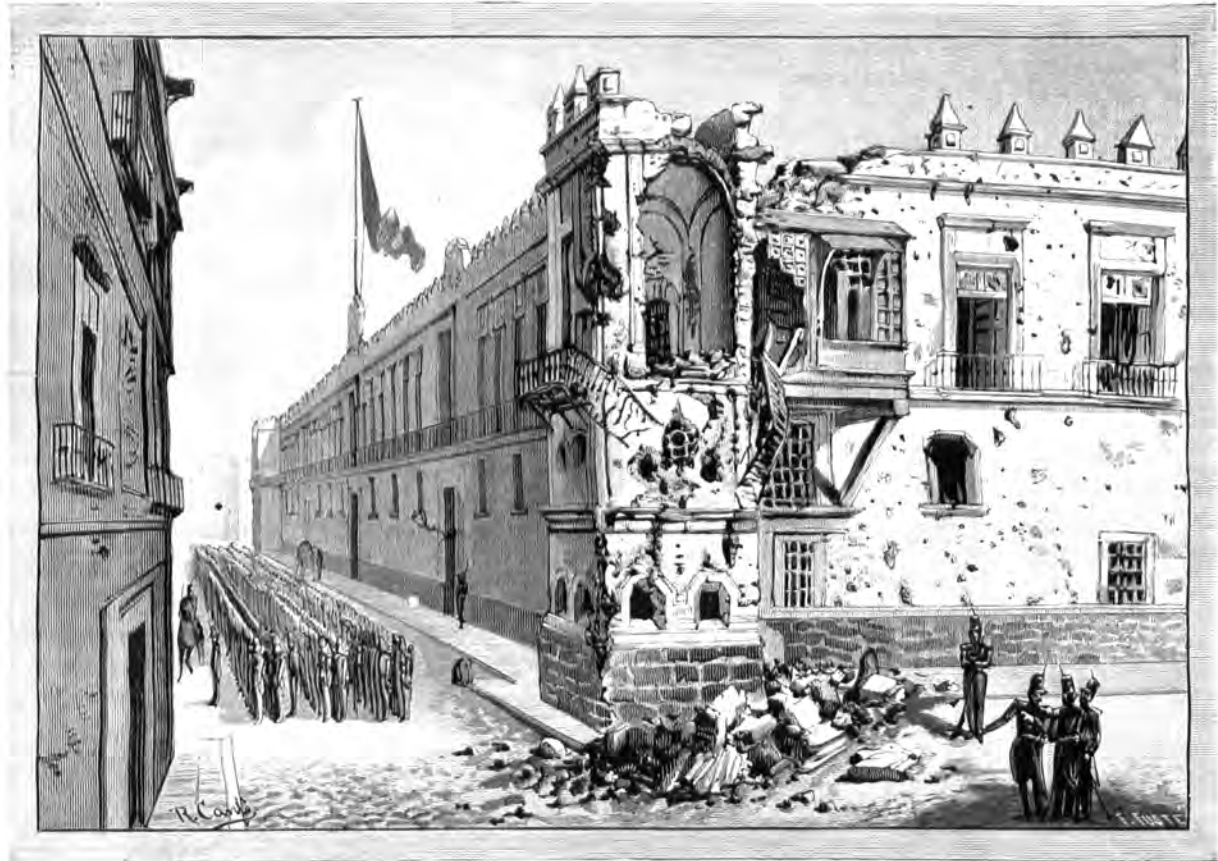
Aftermath of the Federalist Revolt of 1840 which influenced Estrada to write his monarchist essay.

Bustamante would escape and triumph over the rebels afterwards inviting Estrada to assume once more the role of foreign minister, an invitation which he declined. Instead, in October, Estrada published an essay addressed to the president, in which he advocated that the nation ought to seek to organize a national convention tasked with exploring any means of resolving the national disorders which had convulsed the nation for two decades, including exploring the possibility of changing the form of government. Estrada was open about his own opinions that the republic had failed, and that Mexicans ought to invite a European prince, above Mexican partisan conflicts, to found a Mexican monarchy.

He strongly criticized the notion that there was one ideal form of government for all nations and all circumstances and pointed out the troubles that liberals even in France were experiencing trying to set up republic in recent times. He also warned that the chaos Mexico was experiencing was inevitably leading to foreign intervention. He warned of a future American annexation of Mexico, and preferred to at least have the choice of selecting a foreign monarch who would have a vested interest in the success of Mexico.

The Mexican government reacted to the pamphlet by characterizing it as treasonous and as an incitement to civil war. Multiple refutations were penned. The publisher was imprisoned, and Gutierrez Estrada was exiled to Europe. The Scottish wife of the Spanish ambassador in Mexico, Fanny Calderon who personally knew Estrada, recorded witnessing the reaction to the essay in her memoirs Life in Mexico. Despite the initial negative reception, the Mexican–American War eventually bore out some of Estrada's predictions, encouraging and vindicating him in his continued campaign to establish a monarchy.

== Second Mexican Empire ==
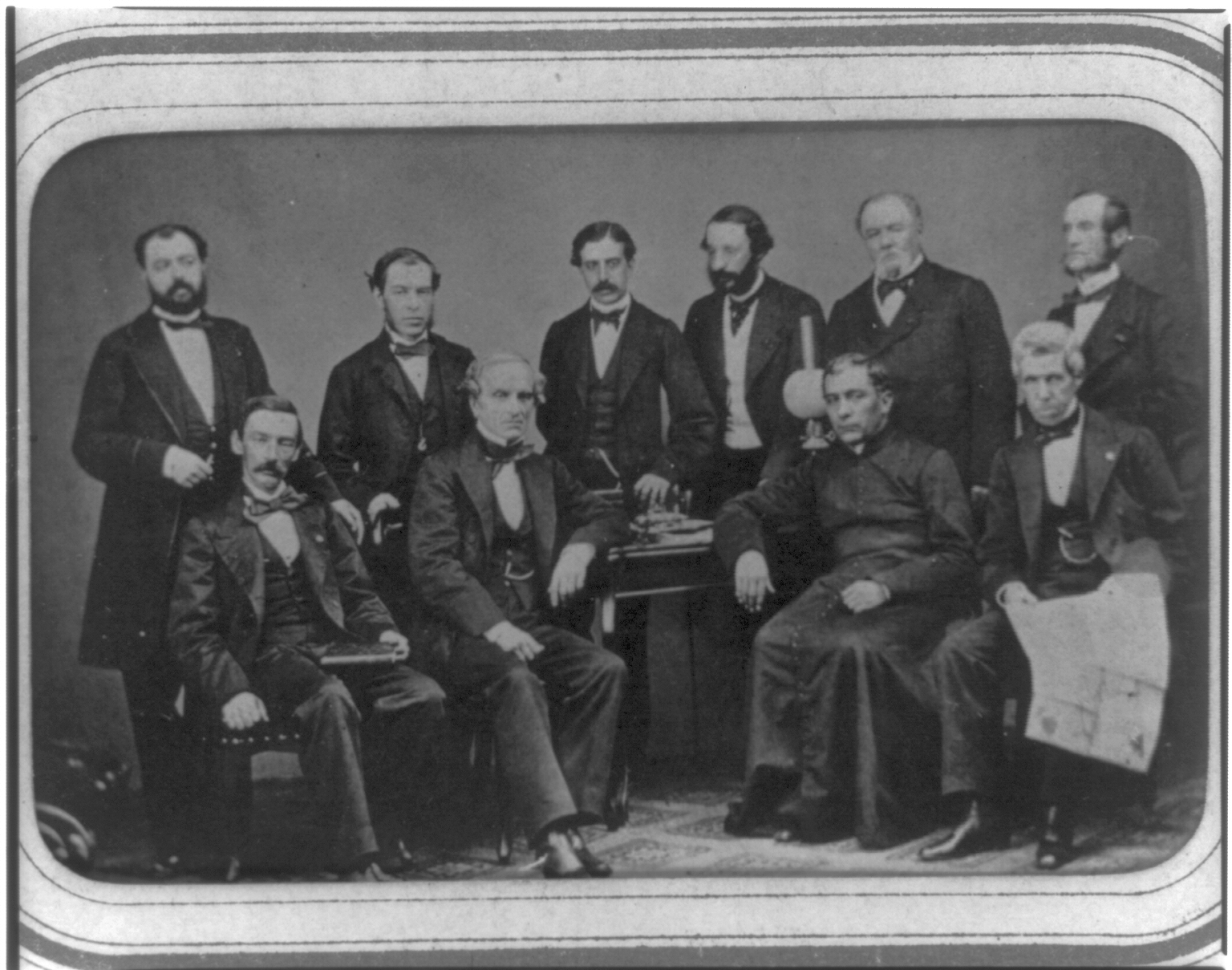
The Mexican delegation to Maximilian with Estrada in the front row, second from left

In 1853, a coup overthrew president Mariano Arista, and the conservative statesman and monarchist Lucas Alamán invited Santa Anna to assume the presidency of the nation, intending for him to hold power only until a foreign monarch could be found.The government established contact with José María Gutiérrez Estrada and granted him official diplomatic credentials, instructing him to start looking for a royal candidate among the courts of Britain, France, Austria-Hungary, and Madrid. Upon the suggestion of Estrada, another monarchist, José Manuel Hidalgo was granted a diplomatic post in Spain in order to seek a Spanish candidate for the throne. Lucas Alamán died on June 2, 1853, and in 1855, a liberal coup overthrew Santa Anna, and Estrada and Hidalgo lost official government recognition, thus ending the official effort to seek a monarchy for Mexico.

Estrada and Hidalgo nonetheless continued their campaign for the establishment of a Mexican monarchy in spite of no longer having any government accreditation. Gutierrez met with Napoleon III in June 1857. Hidalgo regained an official diplomatic post with the Mexican government, but with no authority or instructions to pursue any monarchist project. The most important connection which Hidalgo made was with Eugénie de Montijo, a Spanish noblewoman who at this time was wife of Napoleon III. At a meeting in Biarritz in August, 1857 regarding Mexican-Spanish affairs, the French Empress expressed her opinion that the establishment of a monarchy could benefit Mexico. Hidalgo explained that such a project had been attempted in 1846 and in 1854. Montijo became enthusiastic about the idea of a Mexican monarchy, and began to lobby for the matter with her husband. Gutierrez Estrada and Hidalgo continued to lobby to Napoleon III on behalf of a potential monarchy, but Napoleon in 1857 responded that he had no pretext to intervene, and did not wish to antagonize the United States.

In July 1861, in response to a financial crisis, the Mexican government suspended payment of its foreign debt. France, Spain, and Great Britain agreed to militarily intervene, but only to settle the question of Mexico's debts. As the United States then began to get involved in its Civil War however, Napoleon finally had a pretext and a free hand to carry out the plans that had been laid out to him by Estrada, Hidalgo and Radepont. The expedition landed in Mexico in December 1861, but Spain and Great Britain withdrew once France's ulterior motives became known. The French invasion of Mexico began in April, 1862.

They were eventually joined by conservative Mexican generals who had never been entirely defeated in the War of Reform. After Charles de Lorencez's small expeditionary force was repulsed at the Battle of Puebla, reinforcements were sent and placed under the command of Élie Forey. The capital was taken by June, 1863 and the French now sought to establish a friendly Mexican government. Forey appointed a committee of thirty five Mexicans, the Junta Superior who then elected three Mexican citizens to serve as the government's executive: Juan Nepomuceno Almonte, José Mariano Salas, and Pelagio Antonio de Labastida. In turn this triumvirate then selected two hundred fifteen Mexican citizens to form together with the Junta Superior, an Assembly of Notables.

The Assembly met in July 1863 and resolved to invite Ferdinand Maximilian to be Emperor of Mexico. The executive triumvirate was formally changed into the Regency of the Mexican Empire. An official delegation left Mexico and arrived in Europe on October, where they were joined by Estrada who was made the formal head of the delegation. Upon meeting the delegation, Maximilian set forth the condition that he would only accept the throne if a national plebiscite approved of it. By February, 1864 Franco-Mexican forces controlled territory compromising the majority of Mexico's population, and returns from a plebiscite claiming to show that a majority of Mexicans were in favor of the Empire were sent to Maximilian, which he accepted. Maximilian formally accepted the crown on 10 April 1864, and set sail for Mexico. Estrada remained in Europe as Maximilian's foreign representative.

While Maximilian was a reformer with some local support, he was installed by a foreign power and lacked popular legitimacy. Throughout his reign, Mexico remained in a civil war against supporters of the overthrown Mexican republic. The United States also never recognized the Empire, and after the end of the Civil War, placed diplomatic pressure on France to leave the continent. The French acquiesced and began to leave in 1866. The Empire survived a few months more as Maximilian and his Mexican supporters engaged in a last stand against the Republicans. They were defeated however, and Maximilian along with his two leading Mexican generals were tried and executed on June 19, 1867. Estrada had died almost exactly one month earlier in Paris on May 17.

== Personal life ==
He was married to Loreto Gomez de la Cortina. They had two children. After the death of his first wife, he married the daughter of the Marquis of Saint Laurent. His third marriage was to the Countess of Liitzow.
