= Joaquín Velázquez de León =

Mexican politician and diplomat (1903–1882)

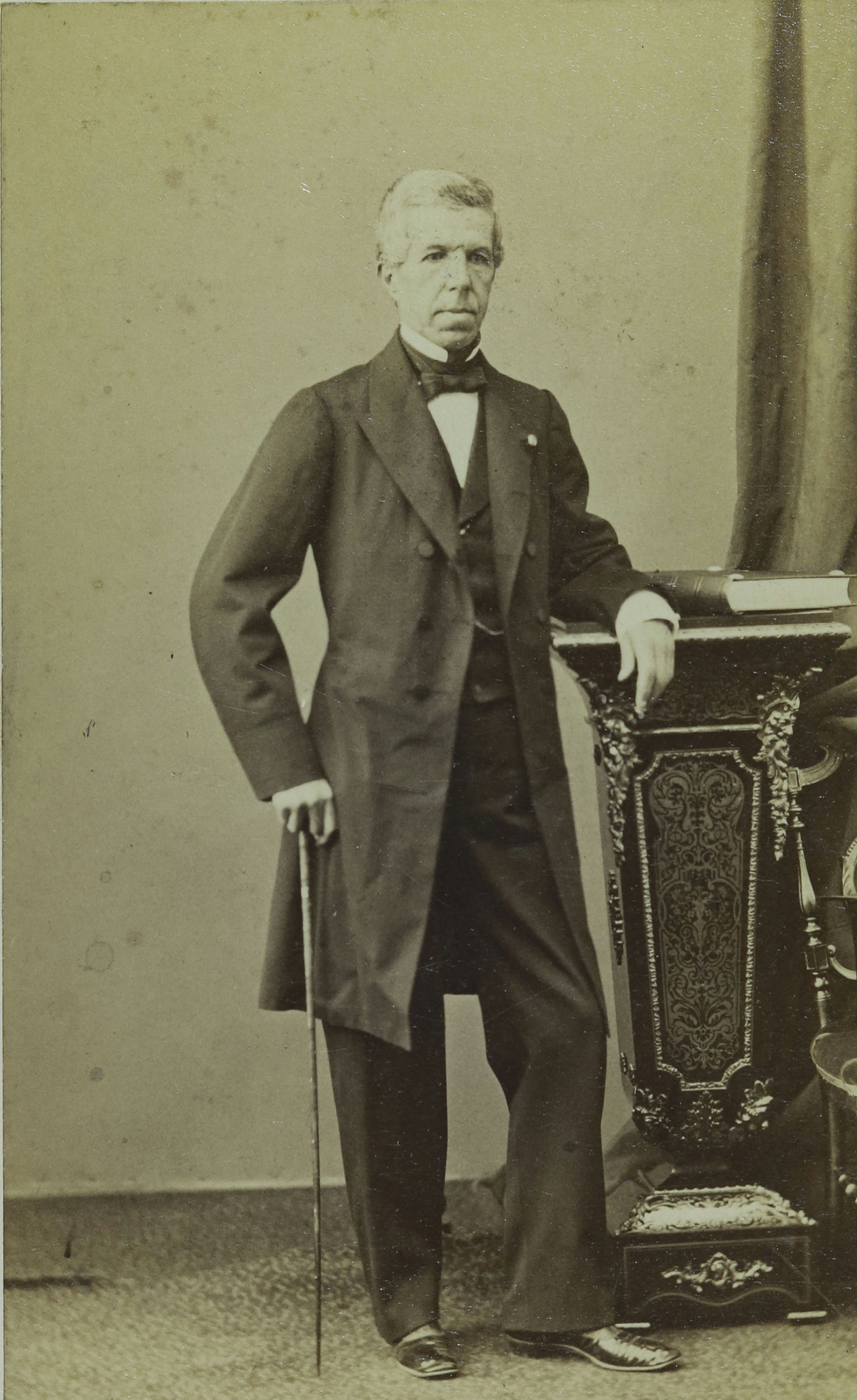
- Joaquín Velázquez de León, 1865

Minister of State
- In office 2 July 1864 – 3 March 1866
- Monarch: Maximilian of Mexico

Minister of Colonization, Industry and Commerce
- In office 26 April 1853 – 1855
- President: Antonio López de Santa Anna

Chargé d'affaires of Mexico to the United States (ad interim)
- In office 3 February 1842 – 25 October 1842
- Preceded by: Francisco Pizarro Martínez
- Succeeded by: Juan Nepomuceno Almonte

Personal details
- Born: 16 March 1803 Zacualpan
- Died: 8 February 1882 (aged 78) Tacuba, Mexico City
- Parent(s): Juan Felipe Velázquez de León and María Guadalupe Álvarez y Güitian (married on 24 October 1782)
- Education: Royal College of Mining (1817–1821)
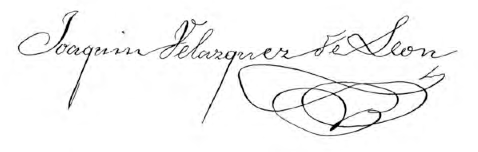
- Signature

Joaquín Velázquez de León (16 March 1803 – 8 February 1882) was a 19th-century conservative politician of Mexico who served as the founding Minister of Colonization, Industry and Commerce (1853–1855) in the cabinet of Antonio López de Santa Anna, as minister of State of Emperor Maximilian of Mexico (1864–1866) and as chargé d'affaires (ad interim) of Mexico to the United States (1842).

== Biography ==
Velázquez was born on 16 March 1803 in Zacualpan to Juan Felipe Velázquez de León, cousin of the scientist and lawyer, Joaquín Velázquez Cárdenas y León, and María Guadalupe Álvarez y Güitian, granddaughter of Francisco de Alarcón y Ocaña, secretary of the Spanish Viceroy and Royal Official of Veracruz (in Spanish: Secretario del Virreinato y Oficial Real de Veracruz).

He enrolled at the Royal College of Mining on 26 February 1817 but suspended his studies on 1 July 1821 to join the 1st American Battalion (formerly, Regiment of the New Spain) of Agustín de Iturbide. He was awarded the Cross of Azcapotzalco for his services during the Battle of Azcapotzalco (19 August 1821) and on 9 February 1822 he was appointed Second Lieutenant in the then recently created Engineers Corps. On 20 July 1822, he was promoted to First Lieutenant and on 23 January 1823, he began to teach Mathematics to the members of the Corps.

Velázquez suffered from blindness during the last 13 months of his life, after damaging his optical nerves while doing a demonstration with one of his telescopes. He died on 8 February 1882 in Tacuba, then a suburb of Mexico City, after suffering three days from pneumonia.

The icteria velazquezi, a variety of the yellow-breasted chat classified by Charles Lucien Bonaparte in 1837, is named after him.

== Works ==
- Reglamento y arancel de corredores para la plaza de México. (1854)
- Reglamento interior para la Escuela Especial de Comercio (1854)
- Notas a las nuevas ordenanzas de minas, puestas para su mejor inteligencia (1875)
