= Nationalist Front of Mexico =

Nationalist Front of Mexico Frente Nacionalista de México
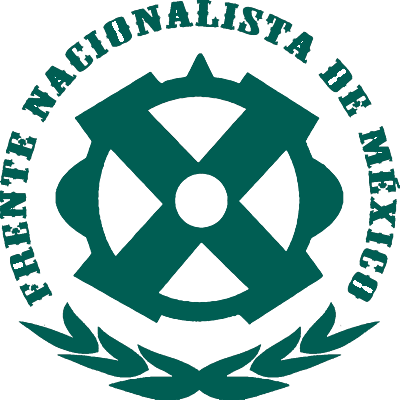
- Abbreviation: FNM
- Founded: 2006; 20 years ago
- Ideology: Panhispanism; Patria Grande; Reconquista; Neo-fascism; Social conservatism Anti-Americanism; Anti-semitism; Homophobia; Distributism; Catholic Integralism; Third Position; Factions: Monarchism (Mexican); Neo-Nazism
- Political position: Far-right
- Colours: Green Gold Black

Party flag
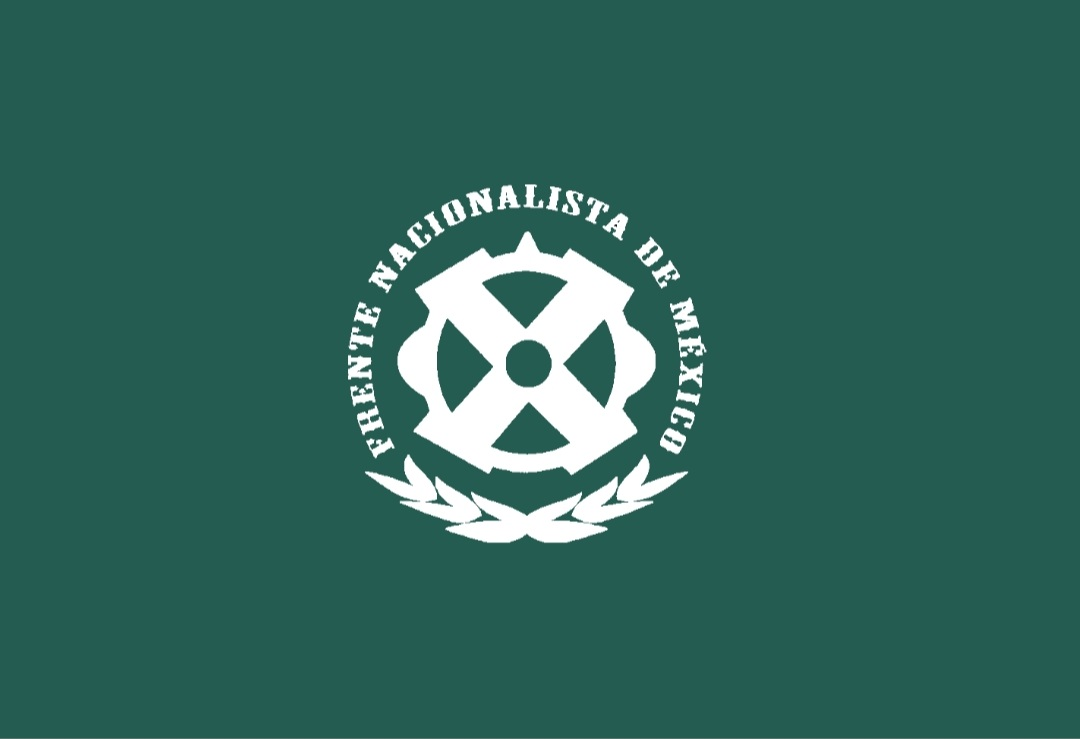

Website
- https://www.facebook.com/siguealfrente/

The Nationalist Front of Mexico (Spanish: Frente Nacionalista de México), formerly known as the Organization for the National Will (Spanish: Organización por la Voluntad Nacional) and the National Mexicanist Front (Spanish: Frente Nacional Mexicanista), is a neo-fascist activist organization in Mexico.

The organization disavows violence.

== History ==
The Nationalist Front of Mexico was formed in 2006 as The Organization for the National Will

In 2012, The party was renamed to the Nationalist Front of Mexico, succeeding its previous name.

The FNM has not registered with the National Electoral Institute for elections, and thus cannot nominate candidates for Presidential or legislative elections.

The FNM has either exited and been expelled from almost every social media platform as the front’s Facebook, Instagram and Twitter (now X) accounts have closed down over the last several years due to each platform’s policies regarding antisemitism and hate speech content promoted by the organization. At the same time – FNM leadership and members accuse social media and mainstream news networks of promoting gender identity, woke ideology and a pro-Israeli agenda.

== Ideology and policies ==
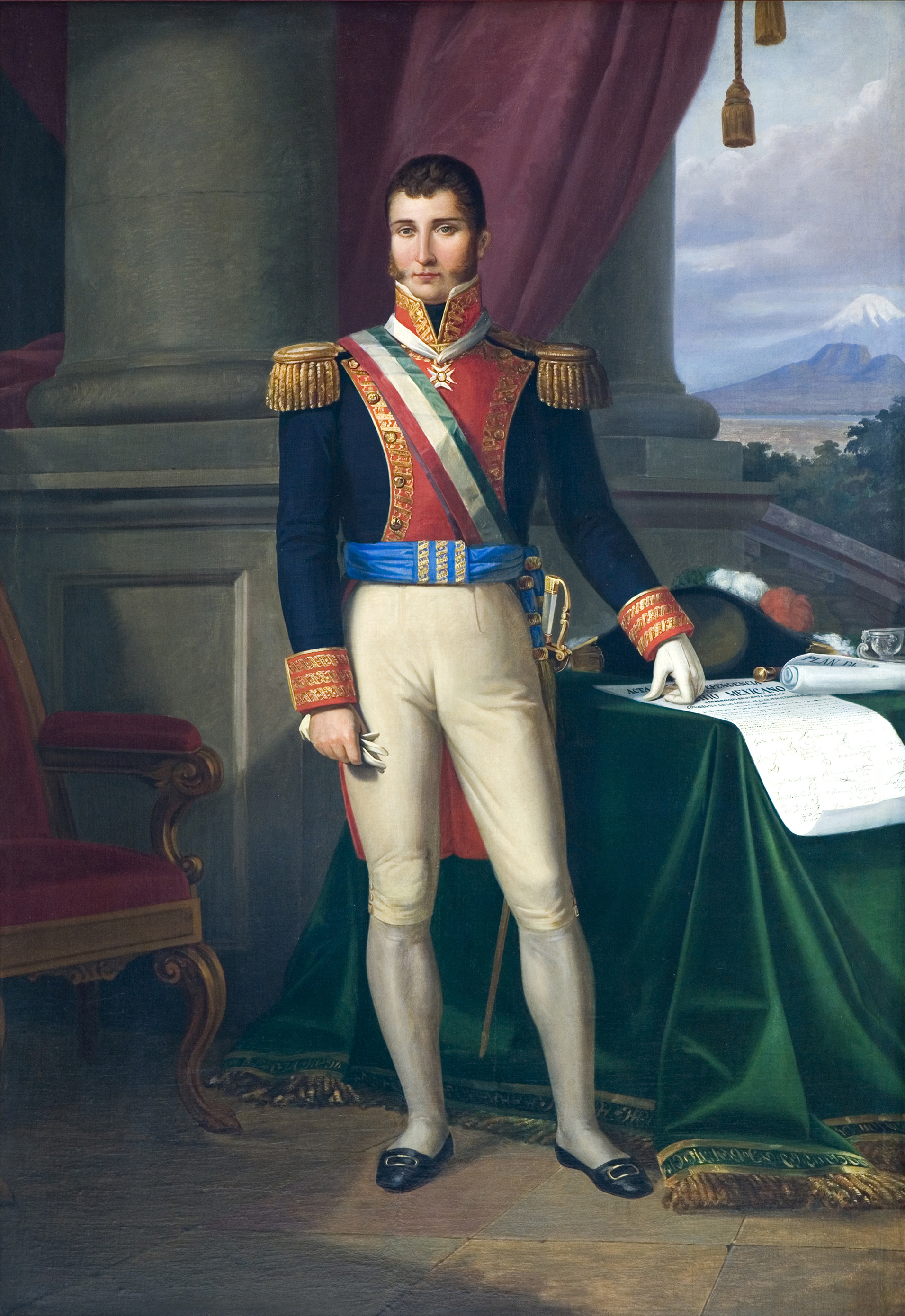
The organization considers Agustín de Iturbide to be the legitimate founding father of the Mexican nation.

The head of the group Juan Carlos López Lee has acknowledged that the group's ideology includes elements of fascism and National Socialism, but disputes that the organization itself is fascist.

=== Reincorporation of territories and Hispanism ===
The organization opposes foreign culture and influences, and rejects the Treaty of Guadalupe Hidalgo of 1848, in which Mexico lost half its territory that now forms part of the southwestern United States.

Nationalist Front of Mexico promotes the reincorporation of Central America to Mexico, claiming that concerning immigration, the modern Central American republics were founded by "self-serving landlords" and since they have separated from Mexico, and that free movement of people between them must come as a result of a political union.

=== Economic policy ===
The Nationalist Front proposes a distributist economy and advocates for Mexico to withdraw from the World Trade Organization (WTO), the North American Free Trade Agreement (NAFTA), and the International Monetary Fund (IMF).

=== Environmental policy ===
The FNM wants to abandon and reject the use of some or all fossil fuels and deregulating the use of renewable fuels, They also encourage private investments for environmental causes and advocate for stricter laws on environmental matters.

=== Judicial system ===
The party seeks a full reform of the Mexican judiciary system and public security which in this case, the party wants the reinstatement of the death penalty that was abolished in 2005 to target pedophiles, serial killers, kidnappers, torturers and drug traffickers and others. They also propose transforming prisons and penitentiaries into work centers.

== Political activities ==
In recent years, the group has gained notoriety for honoring Maximilian I of Mexico and conservatives of the 19th century such as Miguel Miramón and Tomás Mejía Camacho.

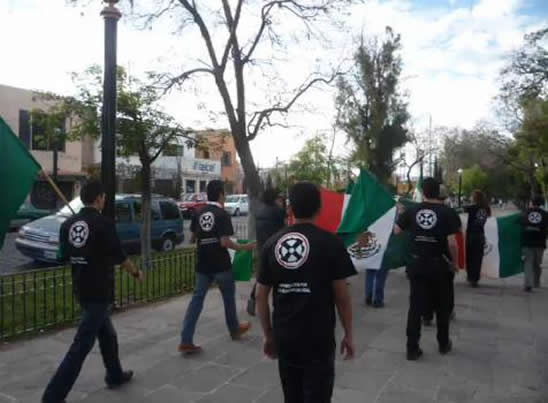
Supporters of the Nationalist Front of Mexico and other protesters in Mexico City, 2010.

Members have also held protests in various Mexican cities to protest the Central American migrant caravans. In 2016, a Nationalist Front spokesman called on the Mexican government to stop issuing transit documents to Haitian migrants due to human rights and security concerns.

== See also ==
- National Synarchist Union
- Gold shirts
- Mexican Democratic Party
