= Juan Almonte =

Mexican general, diplomat and regent

Juan Nepomuceno Almonte
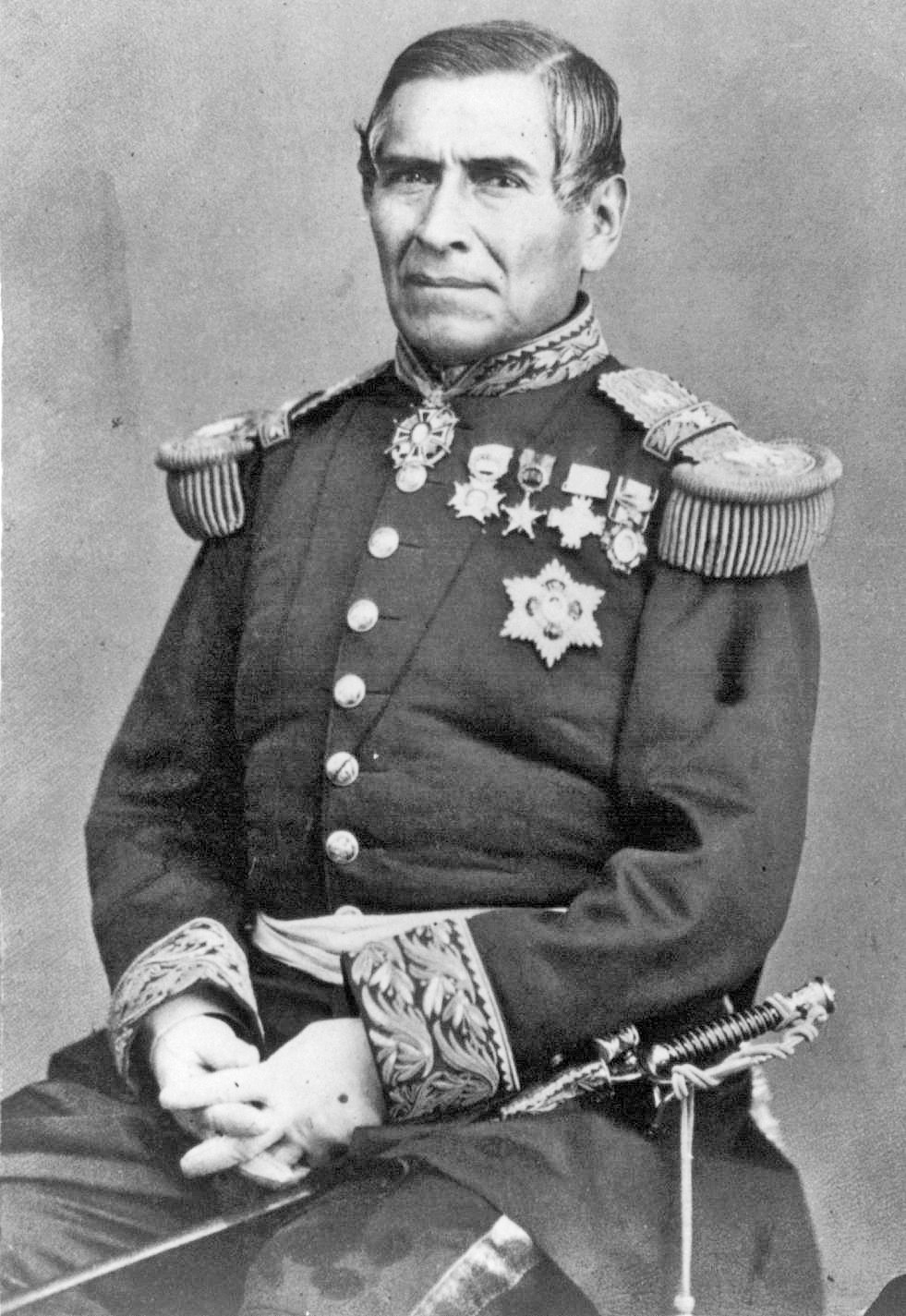

President of the Regency of Mexico
- In office 11 July 1863 – 10 April 1864
- Preceded by: Agustín de Iturbide
- Succeeded by: Monarchy abolished

Regent of the Mexican Empire with José Salas and Antonio de Labastida
- In office 11 July 1863 – 10 April 1864
- Monarch: Maximilian I of Mexico
- Succeeded by: Maximilian I of Mexico

Personal details
- Born: May 13, 1803 Nocupétaro, New Spain (now Michoacán, Mexico)
- Died: March 21, 1869 (aged 65) Paris, French Second Empire
- Party: Conservative
- Spouse: María Dolores Quesada
- Children: María de Guadalupe Almonte
- Occupation: Military officer, diplomat
- Awards: Order of Guadalupe; Order of the Iron Crown; Legion of Honour

Military service
- Allegiance: Second Mexican Empire
- Rank: General
- Battles/wars: Texas Revolution; Battle of the Alamo; Battle of San Jacinto; Federalist Revolt of 1840; Mexican–American War; War of Reform; Second Franco-Mexican War

Juan Nepomuceno Almonte Ramírez (May 15, 1803 – March 21, 1869) was a Mexican soldier, commander, minister of war, congressman, diplomat, presidential candidate, and regent. The natural son of Catholic cleric José María Morelos, a leading commander during the Mexican War of Independence, Almonte played an important role as a conservative in the Mexican Republic. He served as Minister of War during multiple administrations as well as in various diplomatic posts in the United States and in Europe. In 1840 he led government forces in an attempt to rescue president Anastasio Bustamante after the president was taken hostage by rebels in the National Palace. Almonte was minister to the United States in the years leading up to the Mexican–American War and lobbied against its interference in Texas, which Mexico considered a rebellious province. Almonte was a leading figure in conservative efforts to re-establish monarchy in Mexico, supporting the French imperial forces during the Second French intervention in Mexico and the establishment of the Second Mexican Empire under Maximilian I of Mexico. Almonte was serving as a diplomat in France when France withdrew military support of the Empire, which fell in 1867. He died two years later in 1869.

== Early life ==
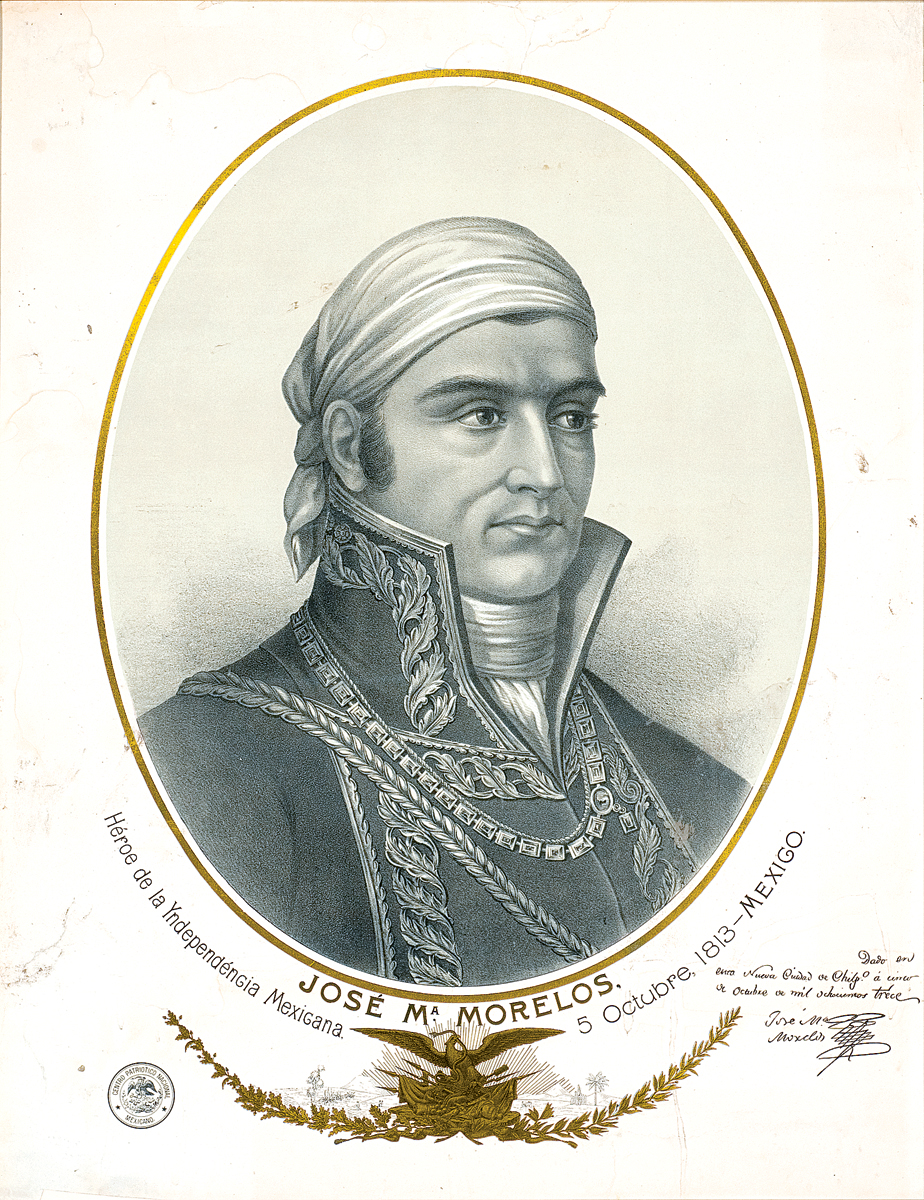
José María Morelos, the father of Almonte.

Almonte was born in the town of Nocupétaro in the state of Michoacán, the out-of-wedlock son of José María Morelos, a Roman Catholic priest who led the insurgents in the Mexican War of Independence from 1811 to 1815, and Brígida Almonte. His mother, Brígida Almonte, was said to be of pure Amerindian ancestry. In 1815 Morelos sent Almonte to New Orleans, Louisiana, where he was educated and learned fluent English. At his trial, Morelos was accused by the Mexican Inquisition following his capture that he had sent his son there to learn the doctrines of "heretical maxims of Protestantism," to which Morelos responded he sent his son there because of his concern about his son's safety in Mexico. While in New Orleans, Almonte worked as a clerk for hardware merchant Puech & Bein. His time in the United States was cut short when his father was executed on December 22, 1815, in the village of San Cristóbal Ecatepec.

Between 1822 and 1824, Almonte was on the staff of insurgent rebel leader José Félix Trespalacios in Texas and then was sent as a part of the Mexican delegation to London. Almonte assisted Ambassador José Mariano Michelena in negotiating a commercial and amity treaty with England. This was Mexico's first treaty as a new nation.

During the Mexican War of Independence, Almonte had been a noted partisan of Vicente Guerrero which would later cause him to go into hiding in 1830 after the liberal Guerrero, who had reached the presidency in 1828, was overthrown, and the conservative government of Anastasio Bustamante began persecuting his followers. During the presidency of Bustamante, Almonte was also associated with the liberals Isidro Rafael Gondra, Anastasio Zerecero, and José María Alpuche. He edited the progressive newspaper Atleta (The Athlete), which was forced to shutdown due to government fines.

Almonte married María Dolores Quesada on March 1, 1840, in Mexico City and they had a daughter named María de Guadalupe Anastacia Aleja Brígida Saturnina.

== Texas Revolution ==
In 1834, Vice President Valentín Gómez Farías appointed Almonte and Col. José María Díaz Noriega to make an inspection tour of Texas and write a status report on what they witnessed. In late January 1836 Almonte was appointed aide-de-camp to Antonio López de Santa Anna and accompanied him to Texas in an attempt to quell the rebellion there.

Santa Anna led his army directly for San Antonio de Bexar, where a small group of Texians was garrisoned at the former Alamo Mission. As the Mexican army occupied the city, Texian co-commander James Bowie sent Green B. Jameson to speak with Santa Anna. Instead, Jameson met with Almonte. According to Almonte, the Texians asked for an honorable surrender but were informed that any surrender must be unconditional. In his March 6 journal entry after the battle, Mexican Almonte listed the Texian casualty toll as 250, with the survivors being five women, one Mexican soldier and one slave. Almonte did not record the names of either the defenders or the survivors, and his count was based solely on who was there during the final assault.

Almonte is said to have had the role in saving Susanna Dickinson. According to some interviews she gave, a Mexican officer intervened to spare her and her daughter's life. This officer was presumed to be either an English mercenary named Black, or Almonte. Then, she said she was taken before Santa Anna, who was talked out of imprisoning her by Almonte.

On April 21, 1836, Almonte, at the head of part of the Guerrero battalion, surrendered to Texian Thomas Jefferson Rusk at the Battle of San Jacinto. Almonte led the last organized resistance of the panicked army. On the following day Santa Anna also was taken prisoner. Almonte stayed with Santa Anna during his imprisonment acting as interpreter and negotiator. Almonte accompanied Santa Anna during his incarceration on Galveston Island. Then they were taken up the Brazos river to the Phelps plantation, about 30 miles from Velasco, and kept there during the summer and autumn of 1836. While staying there the rumors spread that there were plans to rescue the prisoners. When an escape plot was later discovered, Almonte and Santa Anna were each forced to wear a heavy ball and chain for 52 and 53 days respectively. Finally, through the efforts of Stephen F. Austin and Sam Houston, Almonte, accompanied by Texas Vice-president Lorenzo de Zavala and Bailey Hardeman was sent along with Santa Anna to Washington, D.C., where they had several meetings with U.S. President Andrew Jackson. After eight days in Washington, they left the U.S. on January 31, 1837. The party returned to Mexico in February. By then, Santa Anna had been replaced as President of Mexico and went into retirement. Almonte, though, continued his diplomatic and military career and eventually rose to the rank of major general. He published a book on geography in late 1837.

== Minister of War ==
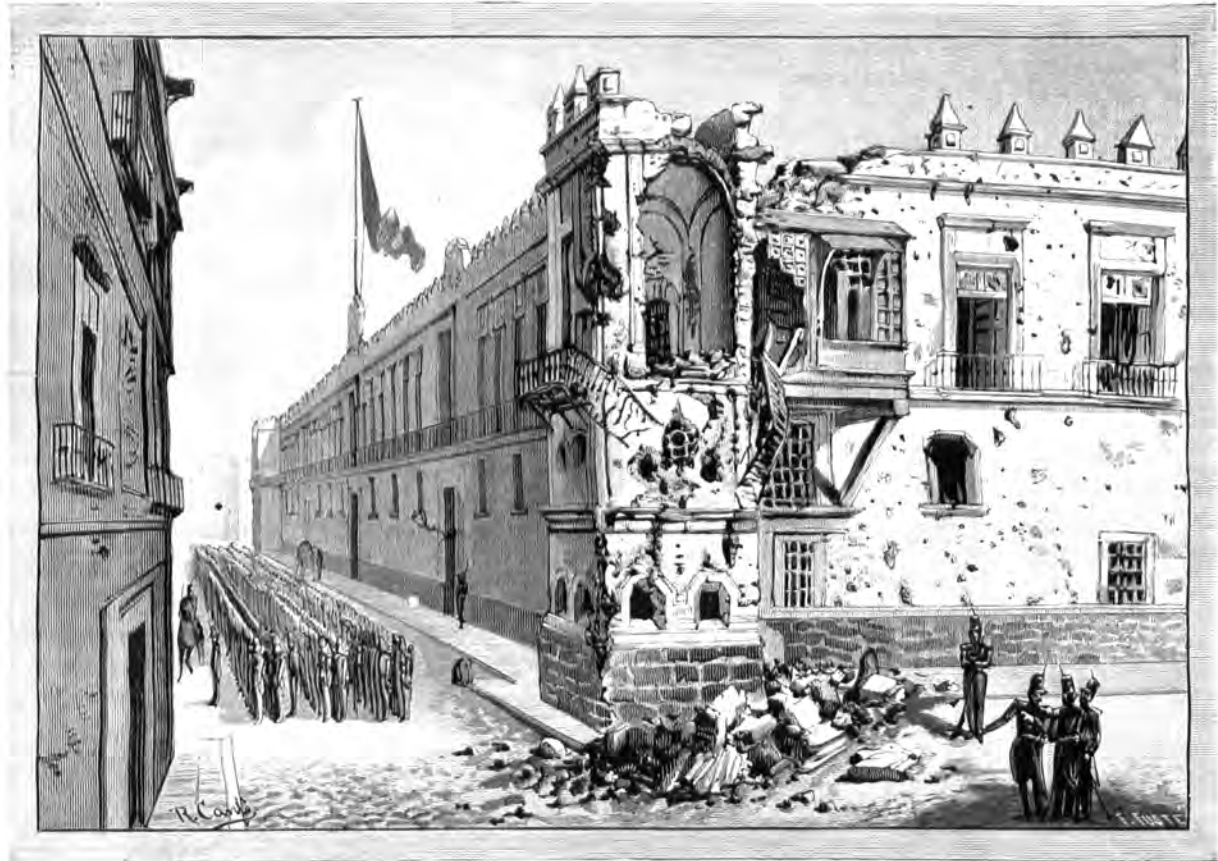
Damage sustained to the National Palace in the Federalist Revolt of 1840 during which Almonte commanded government troops.

By 1839, Almonte's in spite of having been a notable progressive was now serving as Minister of War under a conservative government during the Centralist Republic of Mexico. He nonetheless was still a noted partisan of Mexican self determination. He presented an initiative to congress petitioning them to declare as traitors those Mexicans seeking foreign intervention in Mexico, and initiative which was ratified into law.

During the Federalist Revolt of 1840, during which Anastasio Bustamante who was once again president, was taken hostage by rebels in the National Palace, and week long combat ensued in the middle of Mexico City, Almonte commanded the loyalist troops to aid the man who had once been his enemy, and his efforts were ultimately successful in taking back the National Palace.

In the aftermath of the fighting which had devastated the capital, the statesman and writer Jose Maria Gutierrez Estrada wrote an essay, arguing that after two decades of civil war, the republic had failed, that the instability was making the country vulnerable to predations by the United States, and that Mexico should now invite a European prince to found a Mexican monarchy that could bring stable government to the nation. Ironically, in light of his later role, Almonte found himself as one of the leading figures who denounced the essay, characterizing it as scandalous, offensive to the nation, and anti-constitutional. Almonte ordered as many copies as could be found of the essay to be confiscated. As Minister of War he also addressed a message to the military characterizing Estrada's opinions as delirium and treason.

President Bustamante would be overthrown by a coup in 1841, and while Bustamante went on a failed campaign to put down the rebels, finance minister Francisco Javier Echeverría would be made interim president only for him to go into hiding as the rebels advanced, during which Almonte, as Minister of War, was the remaining visible, and de facto head of government in Mexico City. Still retaining the liberal belief in federalism, Almonte put forth his support for the restoration of the federal system, as opposed to the conservative dictatorship advocated by the rebels Mariano Paredes and Santa Anna, but the effort was futile, and the triumphant rebels would put into effect the conservative and centralist Bases of Tacubaya.

== Mexican American War ==
Boundaries of Texas after the annexation in 1845

Almonte stayed within the government and in that same year in 1841 he was made minister to the United States where he lobbied against intervention in Texas and attempted to maintain cordial relations between Mexico and the United States. As relations between the two republics deteriorated, Almonte resigned his diplomatic post, and when the United States Senate voted to annex Texas, Almonte asked for his passport. Biographer Rivera Cambas has written that it was this development which finally convinced Almonte that United States expansion must be opposed even at the cost of courting European intervention.

Almonte was a candidate for the presidency in 1845, but ultimately lost to José Joaquín de Herrera, who accommodated himself to Texan Independence in order to attempt to preserve it as a buffer state, an attitude which led to his overthrow by military hardliners led by Mariano Paredes in January, 1846. The American invasion of Mexico began in April of that year. Almonte was once again made Minister of War, and he counseled President Paredes to seek foreign allies to give Mexico a fighting chance against the United States.

President Paredes had made Almonte minister to France in March, but while he was headed to Europe, Almonte encountered Santa Anna in Cuba, who was now plotting to return to Mexico in the midst of an anti-Paredes coup which had come about after months of Mexican military failures.

Paredes was successfully overthrown and Almonte was made Minister of War in the new government, during which he organized the national guard, purchased arms, planned maneuvers for the troops in the north, and advocated for American conditions and proposals to be ignored.

== The Reform War ==
After the war ended, Almonte would launch himself as a presidential candidate in 1848 and 1852, and he was elected to congress in 1849. He would also figure prominently in the opposition to the presidencies' of Jose Joaquin Herrera and Mariano Arista.

Almonte played no government role in Santa Anna's final dictatorship of 1852–1853, but after Santa Anna was overthrown by a progressive coalition in 1853, Almonte was made Minister to Great Britain by President Ignacio Comonfort, during which he began to lobby for the foreign intervention he had now begun to believe in.

Comonfort was overthrown by conservatives in 1858, triggering the Reform War, and Almonte remained with the new government, being transferred to Paris as Minister to France. On September 27, 1859, he arranged and signed the Mon-Almonte Treaty with Spain which arranged certain indemnities to be paid to Spain for previous damages to its citizens on Mexican territory. The War of Reform would end in 1860 in a triumph for the liberals.

== French Intervention ==
The French intervention in Mexico, initially supported by the United Kingdom and Spain, was a consequence of Mexican President Benito Juárez's imposition of a two-year moratorium of loan-interest payments from July 1861 to French, British, and Spanish creditors. In October 31, of that year Almonte with other Mexican monarchists, signed the London Convention formalizing plans for intervention in Mexico. In response, the government of Benito Juárez stripped Almonte of his military honors, and Almonte was expelled from various Mexican academic societies.

French troops landed in December, 1861, and began military operations on April, 1862. Britain and Spain would leave after French intentions of overthrowing the Mexican government became clear. The French released a manifesto, proclaiming France to be a liberal country, with the benevolent intentions of setting up a more just government. Almonte published a manifesto supporting the French and urging his fellow Mexicans to join them in establishing a government fit for the Mexican nation.

They were eventually joined by conservative Mexican generals who had never been entirely defeated in the War of Reform.

On May 2 the French army and the Mexican troops under Antonio Taboada reached Amozoc, and on the 4th pitched their camp within the sight of Puebla. Almonte advised Lorencez to attack an orchard of the convento del Carmen opposite the fortified heights of Guadalupe and Loreto, which was not done. He had also previously advised Lorencez to simply bypass Puebla and march on to the capital. Lorencez would proceed to attempt and take the fortified hills overlooking Puebla only to be repulsed.

After Charles de Lorencez's small expeditionary force was repulsed at the Battle of Puebla, reinforcements were sent and placed under the command of Élie Forey. The capital was taken by June, 1863 and the French now sought to establish a friendly Mexican government. Forey appointed a committee of thirty five Mexicans, the Junta Superior who then elected three Mexican citizens to serve as the government's executive which included Almonte. In turn this triumvirate then selected two hundred fifteen Mexican citizens to form together with the Junta Superior, an Assembly of Notables.

The Assembly met in July 1863 and resolved to invite Ferdinand Maximilian to be Emperor of Mexico. The executive triumvirate was formally changed into the Regency of the Mexican Empire. An official delegation left Mexico and arrived in Europe on October. Maximilian formally accepted the crown on 10 April 1864, and set sail for Mexico, arriving in Veracruz on 28 May and reaching the capital on 12 June.

Franco-Mexican troops struggled to pacify the entire country, and the challenge was increased once the United States Civil War ended, and the American government began giving aid to the liberals and placing diplomatic pressure on France to leave the continent. France began to withdraw troops in 1866. Almonte during this time was in France holding a diplomatic role. He would die in Paris in 1869, two years after the fall of the Empire.

== Honours ==
Almonte, Ontario was named after Juan Almonte in 1855, when Canada was concerned with United States expansionism. The town of Almont, Michigan, is also named after him.

== See also ==
- History of Mexico
- Mon-Almonte Treaty
- Timeline of the Texas Revolution

== Footnotes ==
| Preceded by Félix María Zuloaga | Supreme Chief of the Nation; 1862–1863 | Succeeded by Regency |
| Preceded by himself as Supreme Chief of the Nation | Regent of Mexico with Juan Bautista de Ormaechea and José Mariano Salas; 1863–1864 | Succeeded by Maximilian I (Emperor of Mexico) |
