= José Manuel Hidalgo y Esnaurrízar =

Mexican monarchist and ambassador (1826–1896)

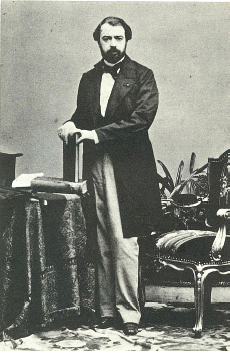
- Born: 6 April 1826; Mexico City, First Mexican Republic
- Died: 27 December 1896 (aged 70); Paris, French Third Republic
- Occupations: Soldier, diplomat, novelist, political writer
- Writing career
- Notable works: Las dos Condesas (1891); Las Victimas del chic (1892); Al Cielo por el sufrimiento (1889); La Sed de Oro (1891); Lelia y Marina (1894); La confesión de una mundana (1896)

José Manuel Hidalgo y Esnaurrízar (6 April 1826 – 27 December 1896) was a Mexican soldier, diplomat, and writer. He played a key role in establishing the Second Mexican Empire.

== Biography ==
Hidalgo was born in 1826 to Mercedes Esnaurrizar and Francisco Manuel Hidalgo, an Andalusian noble and colonel that supported Augustin de Iturbide during the movement for Mexican Independence.

One of his first major jobs was working under the Ministry of Finance, and in 1846 was able to serve as secretary to Manuel Eduardo de Gorostiza.

During the Mexican-American War, he fought under the command of Gorostiza at the Battle of Churubusco, and at the Battle of Contreras was wounded and taken prisoner.

He was appointed by president Manuel de la Peña y Peña to serve as a diplomat in London and was later sent to Rome. In Europe he made the acquaintance of Silvio Pellico, Giacomo Antonelli, Pope Pius IX, Queen Victoria, Pedro V, Ludwig I, and Isabel II. It was his friendship with Eugénie de Montijo, the Spanish-born wife of Napoleon III, that allowed him to lobby for French support of establishing a Mexican monarchy, an effort which ultimately culminated in the Second French intervention in Mexico, and the establishment Second Mexican Empire.

He and other Mexican conservatives opposed democracy and the anti-monarchical efforts set forth by the liberal project, La Reforma. In 1867, he wrote an essay denouncing the popularity of the republican reform project while exiled in Paris. He advocated for a European monarchy, believing it would save Mexico from itself. He considered Spanish culture the highest form of civilization.

After the fall of the Empire, he left Mexico for France. To supplement his income during exile he published several novels. His novels were a mixture of realism and sentimentalism dealing with the aristocracy, the nobility, and the grand bourgeoisie. He died in Paris in 1896.

== See also ==
- Ignacio Aguilar y Marocho
- José María Gutiérrez de Estrada
- Monarchism in Mexico
- Second Mexican Empire
