= Centralist Republic of Mexico =

Period of Mexican history (1835–1846)

Mexican Republic República Mexicana
- 1835–1846
- Flag Coat of arms

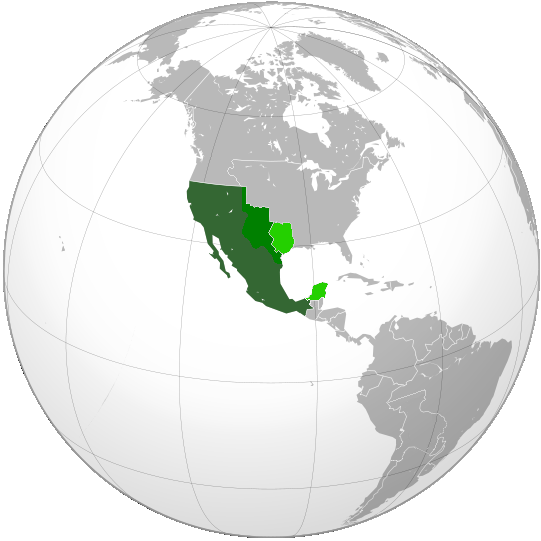
- Mexico; Land claims disputed by Mexico and Texas; Texas and Yucatan
- Capital: Mexico City
- Common languages: Spanish (official), Nahuatl, Yucatec Maya, Mixtecan languages, Zapotec languages
- Religion: Catholic (official religion)
- Demonym: Mexican
- Government: Unitary presidential republic
- President
  - 1835–1836: Miguel Barragán
  - 1836–1837: José Justo Corro
  - 1837–1841: Anastasio Bustamante
  - 1841–1844: Antonio López de Santa Anna
  - 1844–1845: José Joaquín de Herrera
  - 1845–1846: Mariano Paredes
- Legislature: Congress
  - Upper house: Senate
  - Lower house: Chamber of Deputies
- History
  - 1824 Constitution repealed: 23 October 1835
  - Siete Leyes: 15 December 1835
  - Independence of Texas: 2 March 1836
  - Pastry War: 1838–1839
  - Siege of the National Palace: 1840
  - Independence of Yucatan: 1841
  - Bases Orgánicas: 1843
  - Mexican–American War breaks out: 12 May 1846
  - 1824 Constitution restored: 22 August 1846

Area
  - Total: 4,350,000 km^{2} (1,680,000 sq mi)

Population
  - 1836: 7,843,132
  - 1842: 7,016,300
- Currency: Mexican real
Preceded by
First Mexican Republic
Republic of the Rio Grande
Soconusco
Tabasco
Succeeded by
Second Federal Republic of Mexico
Republic of Texas
Republic of the Rio Grande
Tabasco
Republic of Yucatán
California Republic
U.S. provisional government of New Mexico
State of Deseret
Puebla
- Today part of: Mexico; United States

The Centralist Republic of Mexico (Spanish: República Centralista de México), or in the anglophone scholarship, the Central Republic, officially the Mexican Republic (Spanish: República Mexicana), was a unitary political regime established in Mexico on 23 October 1835, under a new constitution known as the Siete Leyes (lit. 'seven laws') after conservatives repealed the federalist Constitution of 1824 and ended the First Mexican Republic. It would ultimately last until 1846, when the Constitution of 1824 was restored at the beginning of the Mexican–American War.

Two presidents would predominate throughout this era: Santa Anna and Anastasio Bustamante.

The Centralist Republic marked nearly ten years of uninterrupted rule by the Conservative Party. Conservatives had attributed the political chaos of the First Mexican Republic to the empowerment of states over the federal government and mass participation in the political system through universal male suffrage. Conservative elites saw the solution to the problem as abolishing the federal system and creating a centralized one, reminiscent of the political system during the colonial era.

The political and economic chaos that had marked the First Republic, however, continued well throughout the Centralist Republic. Infighting among the conservatives resulted in administrations continuing to be interrupted by successful military coups, and another centralist constitution known as the Bases Orgánicas (lit. 'organic bases') would be attempted in 1843. Significant political and military agitation for the restoration of the federalist system continued as well. The period was marked by multiple secession attempts across Mexico, including the loss of Texas and Yucatan, and two international conflicts: the Pastry War, caused by French citizens' economic claims against the Mexican government, and the Mexican–American War, as a consequence of the annexation of Texas by the United States.

Instability in the government due to the beginning of the Mexican–American War, including a revolt by parts of the army, finally resulted in restoration of the Constitution of 1824 on 22 August 1846, beginning the Second Federal Republic of Mexico.

== Background ==
The First Mexican Empire fell in 1823, without having produced a constitution for the newly independent nation. Such a responsibility now fell upon the Supreme Executive Power, which was serving as a provisional government.

The controversy between centralism and federalism first notably emerged during the debates regarding the new constitution, through factions which would eventually become the Liberal Party and the Conservative Party.

Federalism prevailed, through the Constitution of 1824, but the newly established First Mexican Republic proved to be unstable, and presidential administrations were regularly interrupted by military coups. By 1833, the progressive Valentín Gómez Farías was president of the republic, sharing power with Antonio López de Santa Anna, who at this point supported the liberals. The Farías administration however provoked widespread opposition most notably through an anti-clerical campaign. Revolts against the government would continue to flare up and eventually Santa Anna switched sides and supported a successful coup against Farías in April 1834.

== History ==
=== Santa Anna's first period of rule ===
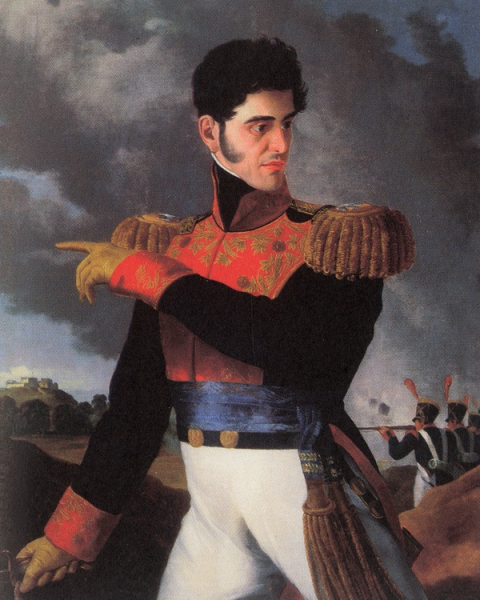
President Santa Anna

Santa Anna dissolved the national congress, state congresses, and replaced state governors and municipal governments with loyalists. He however also maintained that the Constitution of 1824 was still in effect and held elections for a new congress before the end of the year. Santa Anna at this point retired to his estate of Manga de Clavo to rule from the background, as he had during the Gomez Farias administration and he was replaced by Miguel Barragán.

On 23 October 1835, the newly elected bicameral congress decreed to unite and turn itself into a constituent congress tasked with drafting a new constitution. Barragan died of typhus in February 1836 upon which he was replaced by José Justo Corro. Spain and the Holy See recognized the independence of Mexico during the Corro administration. Meanwhile, the resulting centralist constitution which came to be known as the Siete Leyes was formally promulgated in December 1836. The nation was reorganized along unitary lines. The states of Mexico were replaced with departments, whose governors were to be appointed by the central government.

Certain regions of the nation however, responded to the new constitution by attempting to secede.

==== Independence of Texas ====
On 2 March 1836, after a decade of failing to gain provincial autonomy, Texas declared its independence at Washington on the Brazos. Among the delegates voting for independence was the Mexican liberal statesman Lorenzo de Zavala, who had fled to Texas in the aftermath of the fall of the First Republic.

Santa Anna led his troops north to deal with the rebellious Mexican provinces of Zacatecas and Texas. The Zacatecas revolt was crushed, and Santa Anna then directed his forces towards Texas. The Battle of the Alamo ended with a Mexican victory on 6 March 1836. Santa Anna, however, was routed and captured by Sam Houston at the Battle of San Jacinto on 21 April. Santa Anna subsequently signed a treaty recognizing Texan Independence. On 29 July 1836, the Mexican government issued a manifesto disavowing Santa Anna's recognition of Texan independence and urging a continuation of the war.

Meanwhile, Corro's administration had ended and Anastasio Bustamante, who had previously been president during the First Mexican Republic was again elected president in 1837.

=== Anastasio Bustamante's rule ===
Shortly after the inauguration, news arrived that the Spanish government had recognized Mexican independence, in a treaty concluded at Madrid with the Mexican plenipotentiary, Miguel Santa María on 28 December 1836, while Corro was still president. The treaty was ratified by the Mexican congress in May 1837.

==== Río Arriba Rebellion ====
The Mestizo and Pueblo populations of Santa Fe de Nuevo México rebelled against the Centralist Republic in the 1837 Río Arriba Rebellion. Rebel governor José María González he floated a plan to invite foreigners to join the rebellion and annex New Mexico to the United States in return for support of the rebellion. This proposal weakened his support internally. Pablo Montoya overthrew González and betrayed him to the Centralists in return for amnesty for his faction.

==== Pastry War ====
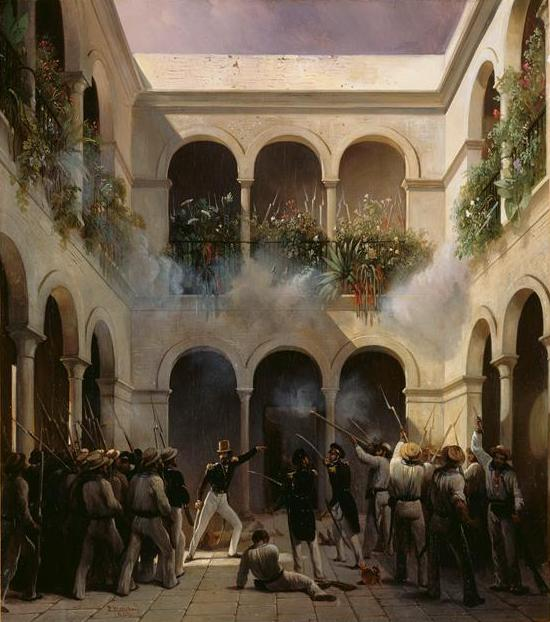
French troops fighting in Veracruz during the Pastry War

France had long been attempting to negotiate settlements of damages experienced by its citizens during Mexican conflicts. The claims of a French baker based in Mexico City would end up giving the subsequent conflict its name.

Diplomatic talks over the matter broke down in January 1838, and French warships arrived in Veracruz on March. A French ultimatum was rejected and France declared that it would now blockade the Mexican ports. Another round of negotiations broke down and the French began to bombard Veracruz on 27 November. The Fortress of San Juan de Ulúa could not withstand the French artillery and surrendered the following day, and the Mexican government responded by declaring war. Santa Anna, who had been disgraced after recognizing Texan independence, emerged from his private life at Manga de Clavo to lead troops against the French, being given a command by the Mexican government.

On 5 December, three French divisions were sent to land at Veracruz to capture the forts of Santiago, Concepcion, and to arrest Santa Anna. The forts were captured, but the division tasked with finding Santa Anna was fought off at the barracks of La Merced. Santa Anna lost a leg in the fighting which gained him much public sympathy after the disgrace he suffered for losing in Texas. Nonetheless, the French had effective control of Veracruz and the results of the war so far led to Bustamante's cabinet to resign.

The United Kingdom, which also had interests in Mexico, had been feeling the effects of the French blockade, and had anchored thirteen vessels in Veracruz as a show of force. France, who did not wish either to enter a conflict with England or to further invade Mexico once again entered into negotiations. An agreement was reached in April 1838 which resulted in a French departure and a Mexican agreement to pay damages to France.

==== Urrea federalist rebellion ====
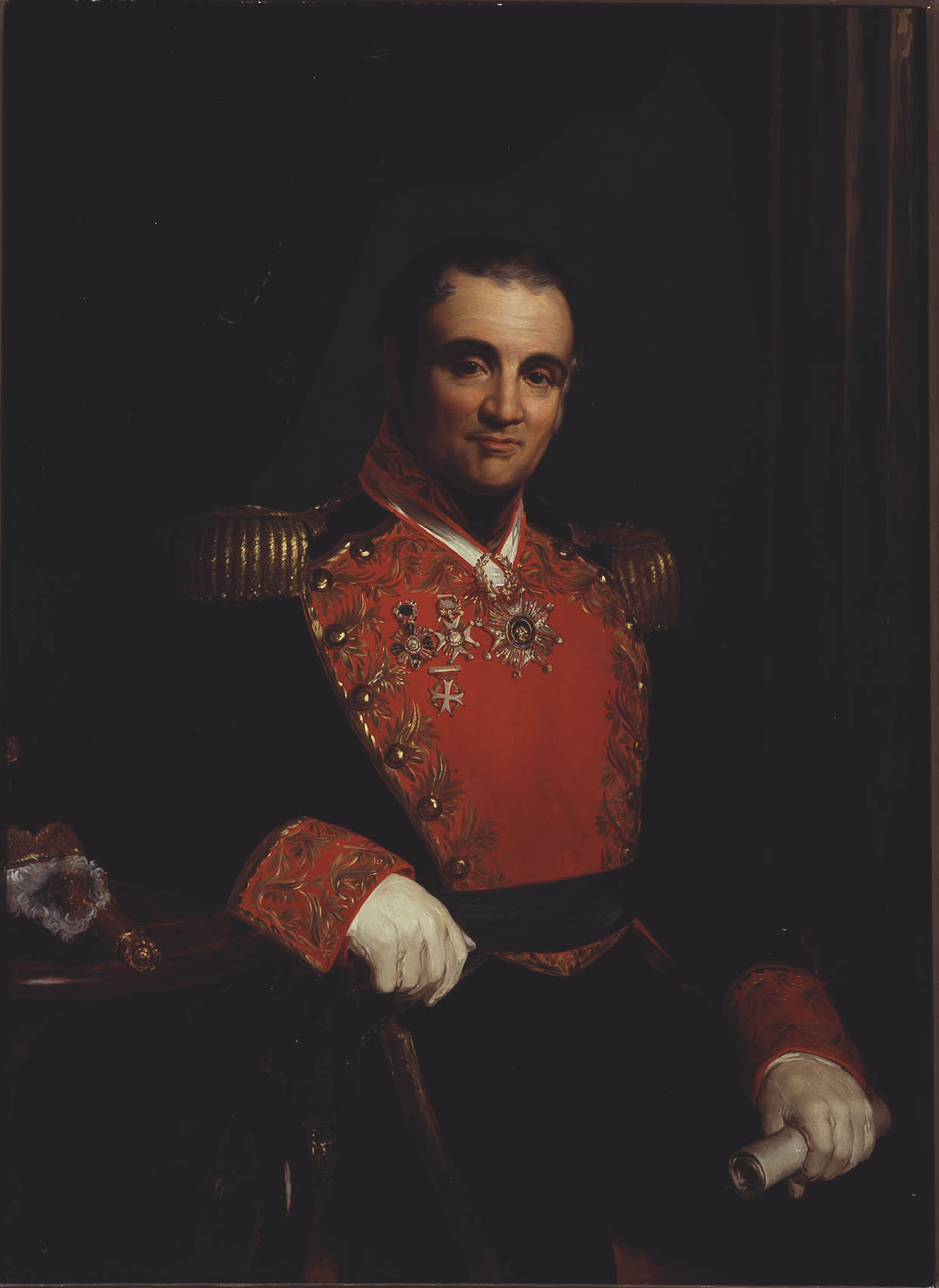
President Anastasio Bustamante

In October 1838, another rebellion against the government broke out in the north of the country at Tampico, and soon placed itself under the command of General José de Urrea who intended to restore the federalist system. The revolt rapidly spread, and the rebels now succeeded in overthrowing the governors of Nuevo León and Coahuila and in March 1839 government reinforcements under General Martín Perfecto de Cos were routed.

Bustamante stepped down from the presidency and assumed command of the armed forces himself. The presidency in the meantime was held by Santa Anna who had been rehabilitated by his role in the Pastry War. Government forces led by Gabriel Valencia defeated the rebels at the Battle of Acajete on 3 May 1839. Urrea however escaped and retreated into Tampico which fell to government forces on 11 June with Urrea being exiled.

==== Independence of Yucatán ====
Bustamante would now go on to face the most serious separatist crisis the country had experienced since the Texas Revolution. Years of frustration with excise taxes, levies, conscription, and increase of custom duties culminated in the standard of revolt being raised at Tizimín in May 1839. Valladolid was captured in February 1840 and eventually joined by Mérida. The entire north-east of the Yucatan Peninsula declared itself independent until Mexico should restore the federal system. Campeche was captured on 6 June, and now the entire peninsula was in the hands of the rebels, who proceeded to elect a legislature and form an alliance with the Republic of Texas.

==== Siege of the National Palace ====
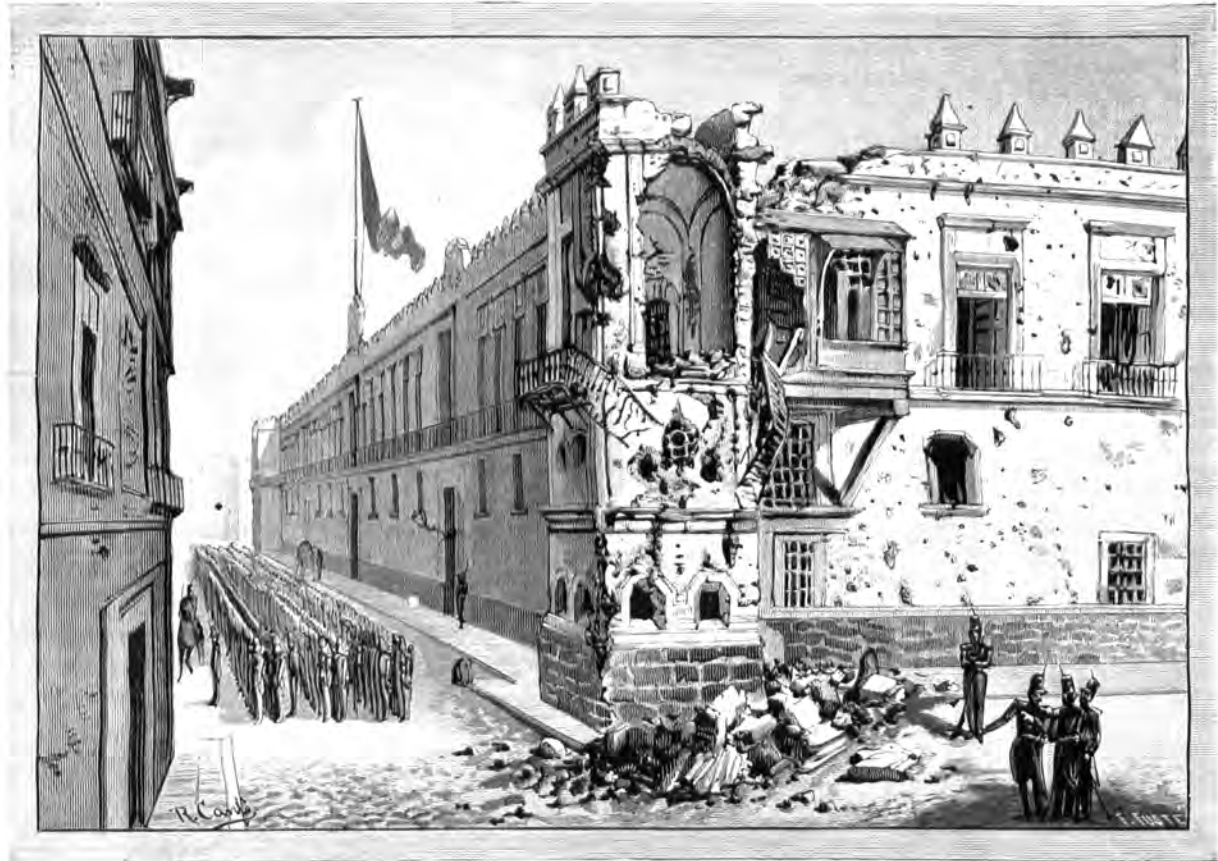
Damage sustained to the National Palace in the wake of Farias' revolt

Bustamante was not able to suppress the Yucatan movement and its success inspired the federalists to renew their struggle. General Urrea had been arrested upon attempting to return to the country but continued to conspire with his associates and on 15 July 1840, he was broken out of prison. With a group of select men, Urrea broke into the National Palace, and took Bustamante hostage. Juan Almonte, the minister of war had meanwhile escaped to organize a rescue.

Valentín Gómez Farías, the exiled last president of the First Mexican Republic, had now arrived in the country to take command of the revolt. Government and federalist forces now converged at the capital. Federalists occupied the entire vicinity of the National Palace while government forces prepared their positions for an attack. Skirmishes broke out the entire afternoon, sometimes involving artillery.

The conflict appeared to be reaching a stalemate, and the president was released in order to try and reach a negotiation. Negotiations broke down and the capital had to face twelve days of warfare, which resulted in property damage, civilian loss of life, and a large exodus of refugees out of the city. Now news was received that government reinforcements were on the way under the command of Santa Anna. Rather than face a protracted conflict that would destroy the capital, negotiations were started again and an agreement was reached whereby there would be a ceasefire, and the rebels would be granted amnesty.

It was in the aftermath of the 1840 Revolt in the capital that José María Gutiérrez de Estrada published a pamphlet, directly addressed to President Bustamante advocating the establishment of a monarchy in Mexico headed by a European prince. The resulting outrage from both the Liberal Party and the Conservative Party was so severe that the publisher of the pamphlet was arrested, and Estrada went into hiding, subsequently fleeing the country.

==== Bustamante's overthrow ====
Crises continued after the fighting in the capital had ended. Tabasco was now trying to secede, the north was facing Indian raids, and a nascent Texas Navy was now on the offensive against Mexico. The ever-present financial crisis had also obliged the government to raise taxes. In response to the Bustamante administration's inability to deal with these financial and political crises, general Mariano Paredes on 8 August 1841, published a manifesto to his fellow generals, calling for the creation of a new government. He gathered an increasing number of adherents and entered the city of Tacubaya where he was joined by Santa Anna.

In September, Bustamante resigned the presidency once again to lead the troops personally and left the presidency to the finance minister Francisco Javier Echeverría. He attempted to proclaim support for the federal system in order to divide his enemies, but the ploy failed. The insurgents were triumphant and Bustamante officially surrendered power through the Estanzuela Accords on 6 October 1841.

A military junta was formed which wrote the Bases of Tacubaya, a revolutionary plan which swept away the entire structure of government, except the judiciary, and also called for elections for a new constituent congress meant to write a new constitution. Santa Anna then placed himself at the head of a provisional government.

=== Santa Anna's second period of rule ===
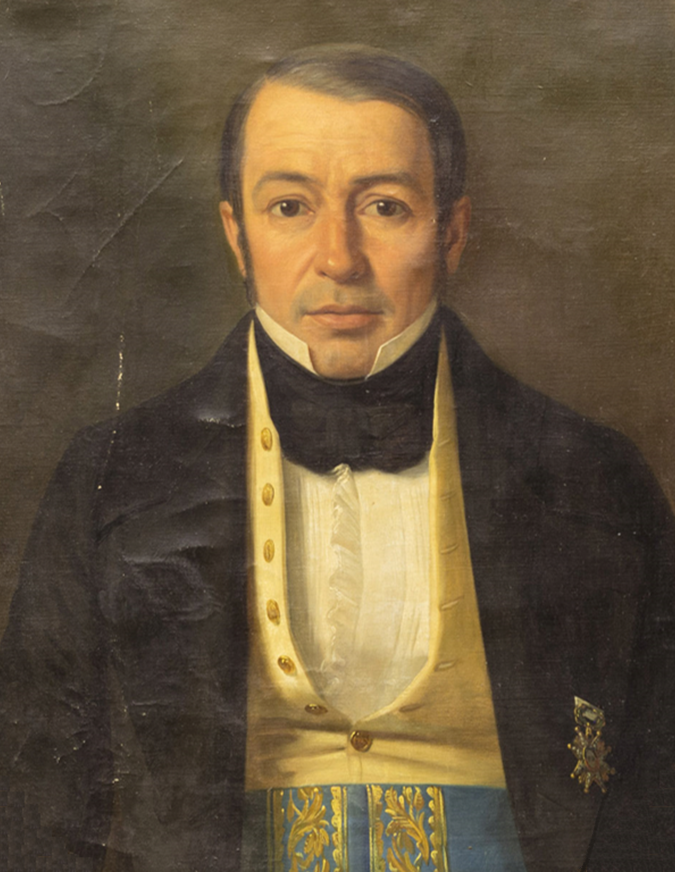
Mariano Paredes

Unfortunately for Santa Anna and his centralist allies, the subsequently elected congress, installed on 10 June 1842 was strongly federalist. Santa Anna began to scheme to dissolve the congress, and left Nicolás Bravo in charge of the presidency on 26 October 1842. Congress was dissolved on 19 December, and replaced by a centralist Junta of Notables. The Junta produced a new constitution known as the Bases Orgánicas on 12 June 1843.

By mid 1844 there were rising tensions with the United States over the matter of Texas, and a series of forced loans had resulted in much disaffection. Paredes who had previously played a key role in overthrowing Bustamante, was considering once again leading a revolution. Paredes proclaimed against the government in Guadalajara and gained support throughout the north of the country.

Without the authorization of congress, Santa Anna led an army north against the revolt and overthrew the departmental government of Querétaro. The nominal president in Mexico City at this time was Valentín Canalizo, though in practice he was a puppet ruler for Santa Anna. Congress condemned Santa Anna for having assumed military command without their authority. The presidential cabinet was censured by congress for allowing Santa Anna to imprison the Departmental Assembly of Querétaro and replacing the department's governor. President Canalizo responded by having congress dissolved, and explaining that its measures were necessary given the ongoing emergency of a potential American annexation of Texas.

This led to a military uprising against the government in the capital. Canalizo resigned and on 6 December 1844, congress was restored and José Joaquín de Herrera was installed as the new president with a new cabinet. The country was now divided into three loyalties between Herrera's central government, Santa Anna's military forces, and Mariano Paredes' military forces.

Paredes and Herrera joined forces and headed against Santa Anna. With the opposing forces about evenly matched, Santa Anna attempted to open negotiations, but Herrera would accept nothing less than unconditional surrender, and Santa Anna began plans to flee the country, only to be arrested near the town of Xico.

=== Mexican–American War ===
==== Herrera Administration ====
As relations worsened with the United States, President Herrera had conceded the possibility of recognizing Texan independence as long as there was no annexation, but this was perceived by his opponents as an alienation of Mexican territory. Mariano Paredes issued a pronunciamiento in December 1845 calling for the overthrow of the government. President Herrera was not able to gather much support and resigned on 30 December 1845. Paredes and his forces entered the capital three days later.

==== Paredes Administration ====
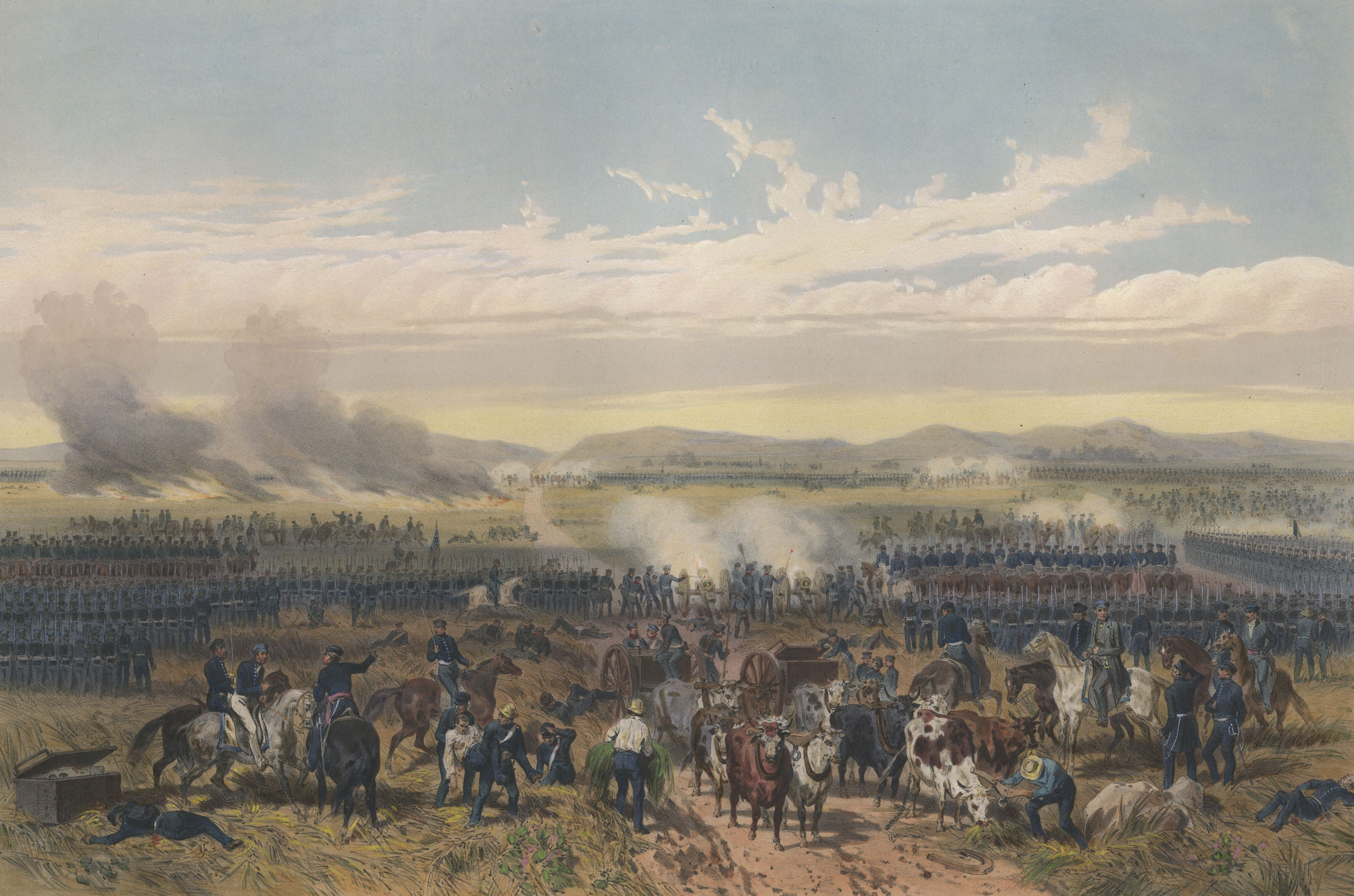
The Battle of Palo Alto

On 3 January, Mariano Paredes ascended to the presidency. On 26 January 1846, an official government convocation was decreed summoning an extraordinary congress with the power to make constitutional changes. It was to be made up of 160 deputies, organized on a corporatist basis, representing not geographical areas, but nine classes: land owners, merchants, miners, manufacturers, literary men, magistrates, public functionaries, clergy, and army, elected by the members of those classes.

The United States had annexed Texas in December 1845 and troops led by Zachary Taylor had begun to patrol territory that Mexico still claimed. Mexican troops clashed with American troops through the Thornton Affair on the Rio Grande on 25 April 1846 and the United States declared war in response on 12 May.

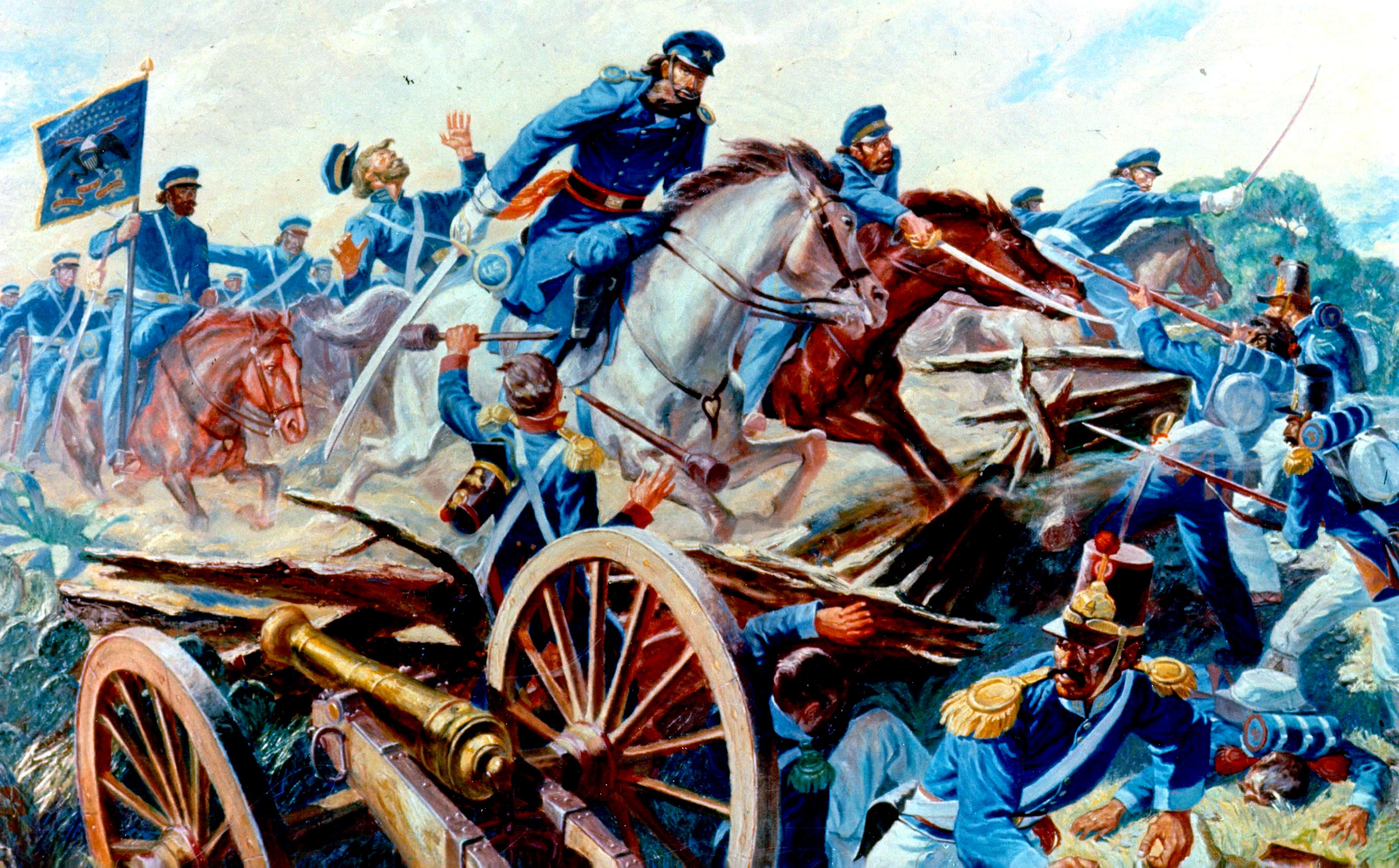
Battle of Resaca de la Palma

In the first few months of the war, the Paredes administration was confronted with a catastrophic series of losses. Mexican forces were defeated at the Battle of Palo Alto and the Battle of Resaca de la Palma. U.S. forces under Zachary Taylor had crossed the Rio Grande, and undefeated through a series of battles made it as far south as Saltillo. Meanwhile, American forces were seizing Alta California.

The constituent congress met on 28 July 1846 and initially ratified Paredes as president and granted him emergency powers, but as the course of the war inflamed opposition against the government, and Paredes faced revolution, he resigned on 28 July, choosing to return to the military to help with the war effort.

==== Restoration of the Federalist System ====
On 3 August, the garrisons of Vera Cruz and San Juan de Ulua revolted. José Mariano Salas was made the provisional president, and on 22 August 1846 restored the Constitution of 1824, putting an end to Centralist Republic and inaugurating the era of the Second Federal Republic of Mexico.

== Government ==
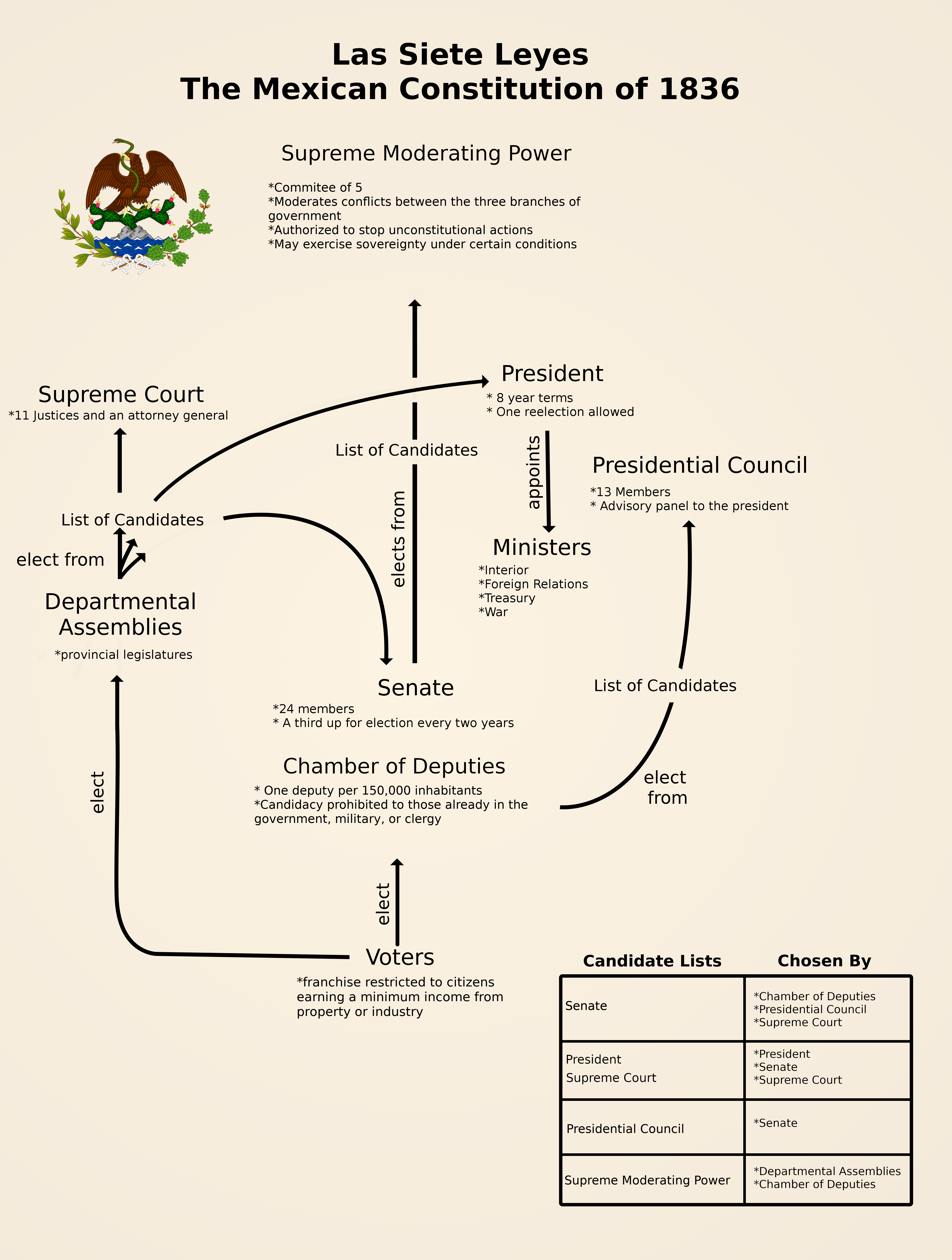
Diagram illustrating the government organized by the Siete Leyes

=== Constitution of 1835: the Siete Leyes ===
The Siete Leyes involved a change from the federal system of the First Republic to a unitary arrangement in which the states of Mexico were changed into departments subject to the direct control of Mexico City. State legislatures were reduced to departmental assemblies, small committees made up of only seven men, nonetheless popularly elected. Departmental governors were appointed by the central government from nominees provided by the departmental assemblies.

The bicameral legislature of the First Republic was preserved, although deputies and senators had to meet respective income requirements. Candidates to the presidency had to meet an even higher income requirement. The popular franchise was also restricted only to men earning a certain income.

One of the Siete Leyes's most notable innovations was the institution of a fourth branch of government, the so-called Supremo Poder Conservador, the Supreme Moderating Power, upon the advice of Francisco Manuel Sánchez de Tagle, influenced by the ideas of Benjamin Constant. It was a committee of five men constitutionally standing even above the president, with the power of deposing presidents, dissolving congress, and suspending laws if necessary, to preserve the constitutional order.

=== Constitution of 1843: the Bases Orgánicas ===
The Bases Organicas did away with the Supremo Poder Conservador, but otherwise preserved the unitary system in which the franchise was restricted by income requirements.

Elections to departmental assemblies and the chamber of deputies were however now to be filtered through a series of electoral colleges.

== Departments of the Centralist Republic ==
The Centralist Republic with the separatist movements generated by the dissolution of the Federal Republic. Area in rebellion Area claimed by the Republics of Texas and the Rio Grande Area not in rebellion

The Centralist Republic turned its states and territories into departments by one of the Siete Leyes. This was unpopular and led to several revolts in the departments of Zacatecas, Texas, las Californias, New Mexico, Sonora, Sinaloa, Tabasco, Coahuila, Nuevo León, Tamaulipas, and Yucatán. The rebellions in Texas and Yucatán established effective independence from the Centralist Republic.

== Science and education ==
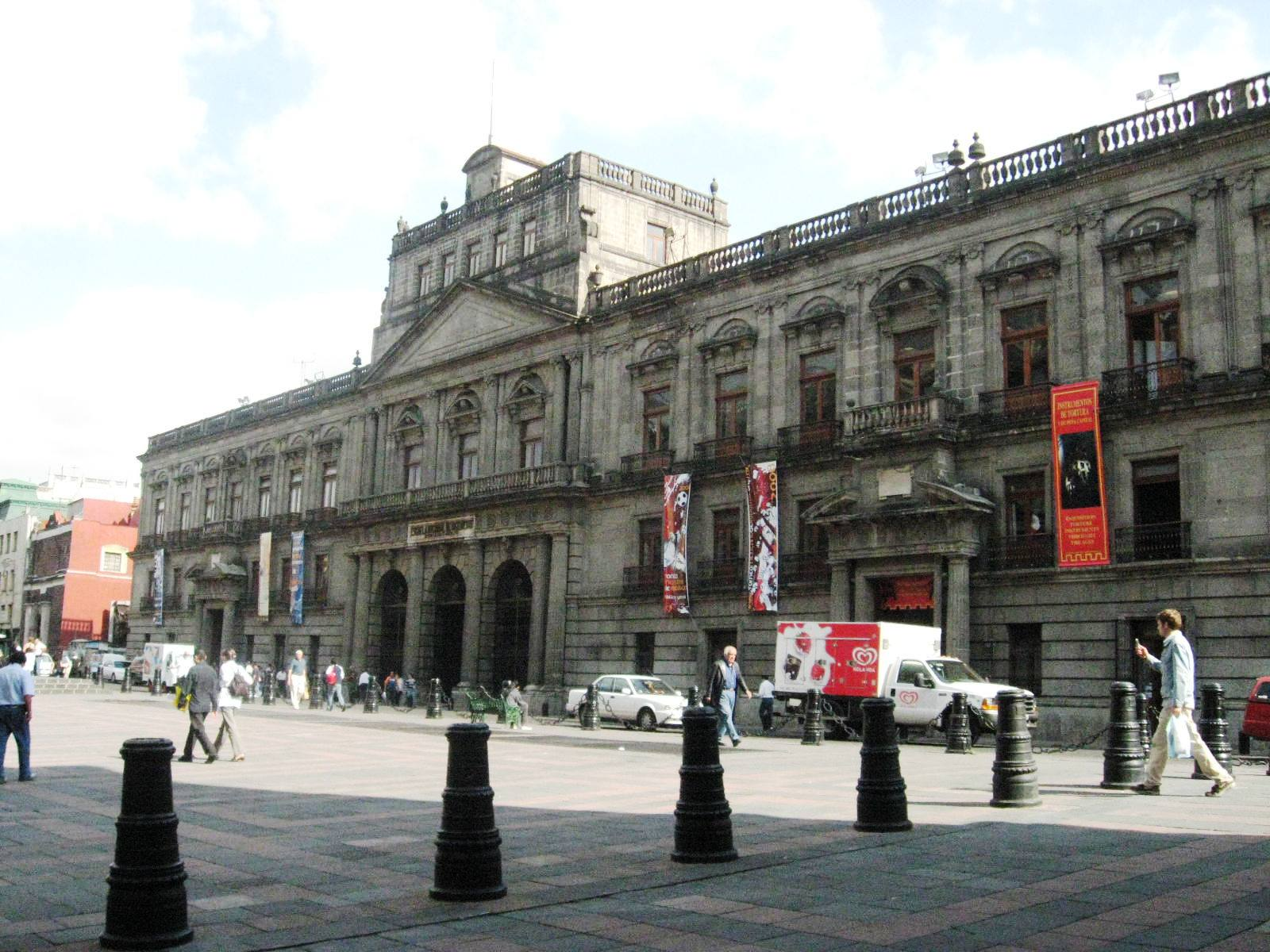
The Mexico City Palacio de Minería (Palace of Mining), which was home to the prestigious College of Mines

The Centralist Republic involved a constitutional change for Mexico from a federal to a unitary republic, and hence Mexico City now had direct jurisdiction over every state educational institution in the country. President Santa Anna personally had a strong commitment to education. In 1836, the centralist government declared that every department should establish schools in all of its villages. In 1843 they decreed the nationalization of every college receiving state funding. A directory general for primary instruction was established along with a board of directors for higher education. There were 1,310 primary schools by 1843 in comparison to the 10 such schools which existed in 1794 under Spanish Colonial administration.

A military college was decreed in 1833 at the instigation of Pedro Garcia Conde, a leading Mexican geographer, and the establishment was finally opened in 1836 with courses in drawing, mathematics, physics, and tactics. In 1838, courses in mechanics, astronomy, geodesy, and fortification were added.

The government established a mercantile development committee in 1841 with the aim of promoting business education. It began publishing newspapers, and in 1845, established a commercial school with classes in bookkeeping, business arithmetic, commercial geography, and foreign languages.

On 15 November 1841, the government established a committee for the general direction of industry with the aim of promoting mining, agriculture, and commerce, and in 1843 began to organize a School of Agriculture administered by José Urbano Fonseca Martínez. It also gave official sanction to the Mexican Atheneum, a private literary society.

A law of 1843 set down a curriculum for medical studies, including courses on physics, chemistry, anatomy and physiology, pathology, hygiene, therapeutics, pharmaceuticals, surgery, obstetrics, and legal medicine, the latter meant to introduce Mexican lawyers to relevant medical knowledge. The Centralist Republic added botany, zoology, logic, grammar, history, English, and German courses to the College of Mines which was then the premier polytechnic institution in the nation. A decree was passed for the establishment of a school of painting on 2 October 1843.

The Mexican Lancasterian Society continued its program of promoting education, founding new schools which offered education free of charge, and lobbying Mexico's ayuntamientos to each open at least one such school, and succeeding in getting a tax passed with the aim of funding education. By 1843, the Lancasterian Society had implemented its curriculum among the twenty one monastery schools in the nation which in total taught a little over 2000 students, almost half in the Department of Mexico, and the rest concentrated in the Departments of Jalisco, Michoacán, and Chiapas. It also implemented its curriculum among the fifty seven convent schools which taught about a thousand girls.

The National Institute of Geography and Statistics which had been founded in 1833 during the First Republic, was reorganized in 1839 as the Commission of Military Statistics under the administration of the Ministry of War.

It was in 1842 that General Pedro Garcia Conde first suggested the construction of an astronomical observatory at Chapultepec Castle. Instructions were sent to Europe for the manufacture of a meridian circle and an equatorial mount. The observatory however would not actually be built until 1878.

== Literature ==
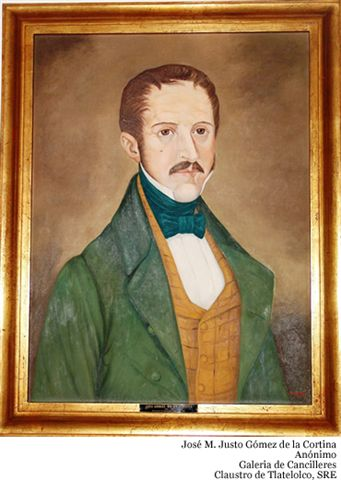
José Justo Gómez de la Cortina

The literary salon known as the Academy of Letrán was founded during this time, developing out of informal literary meetings attended by writers such as Guillermo Prieto, under the leadership of José María Lacunza, who hosted the writers at a room of the School of San Juan de Letrán. The academy was formally established in June, 1836, and soon counted among its members Andrés Quintana Roo, who was named honorary president for life, Manuel Carpio, Alejandro Arango y Escandón, Ignacio Rodríguez Galván, and Ignacio Ramírez, among others.

Guillermo Prieto began editing the literary journal El Domingo (Sunday) during this time through which he began to practice the genre of costumbrismo.

The Mexican dramatist Don Fernando Calderón y Beltrán produced his most famous output during this period while he was living in Mexico City, subsequently gaining fame throughout the rest of Latin America.

The Mexican linguist, literary critic, diplomat, and writer José Justo Gómez de la Cortina during this period became a sponsor of Mexican literature, turning his lavish home in Mexico City into a literary salon. He is mentioned in Fanny Calderon's Life in Mexico, itself a memoir of life during the Centralist Republic. In 1839, Cortina also founded the literary magazine El Zurriago Literario (The Literary Whip), in order to "preserve the shell of the classical tradition in the full tide of romanticism".

The career of Mexican dramatist Ignacio Rodríguez Galván is entirely confined to this period through his three plays La capilla (The Chapel), Muñoz, visitador de México (Muñoz, Inspector of Mexico), and El privado del Virrey (The Viceroy's Favorite), the first relating to the Alonso de Ávila and the Favorite an adaptation of the work of Don Juan Manuel. A series of women's keepsakes, the Calendario de las señoritas mexicanas (Almanac for Mexican Young Ladies), offering a variety of reading selections, began publication in 1843 under the editorship of Rodríguez Galván.

The historian Carlos María de Bustamante, who also served in the government of the Centralist Republic, produced most of his output during this period and died during the Mexican-American War while working on a history of that conflict.

== Economics ==
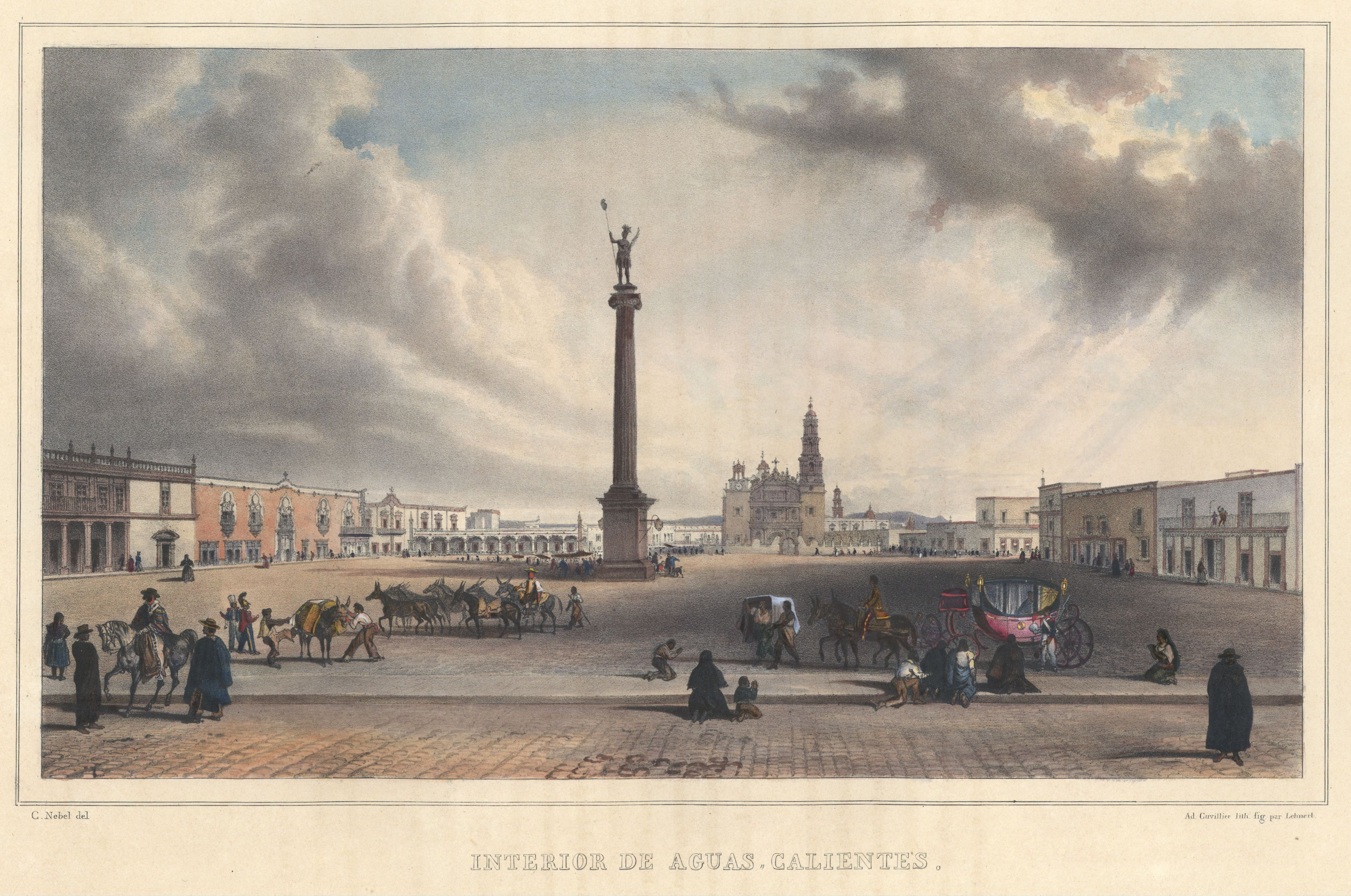
Aguascalientes in 1836.

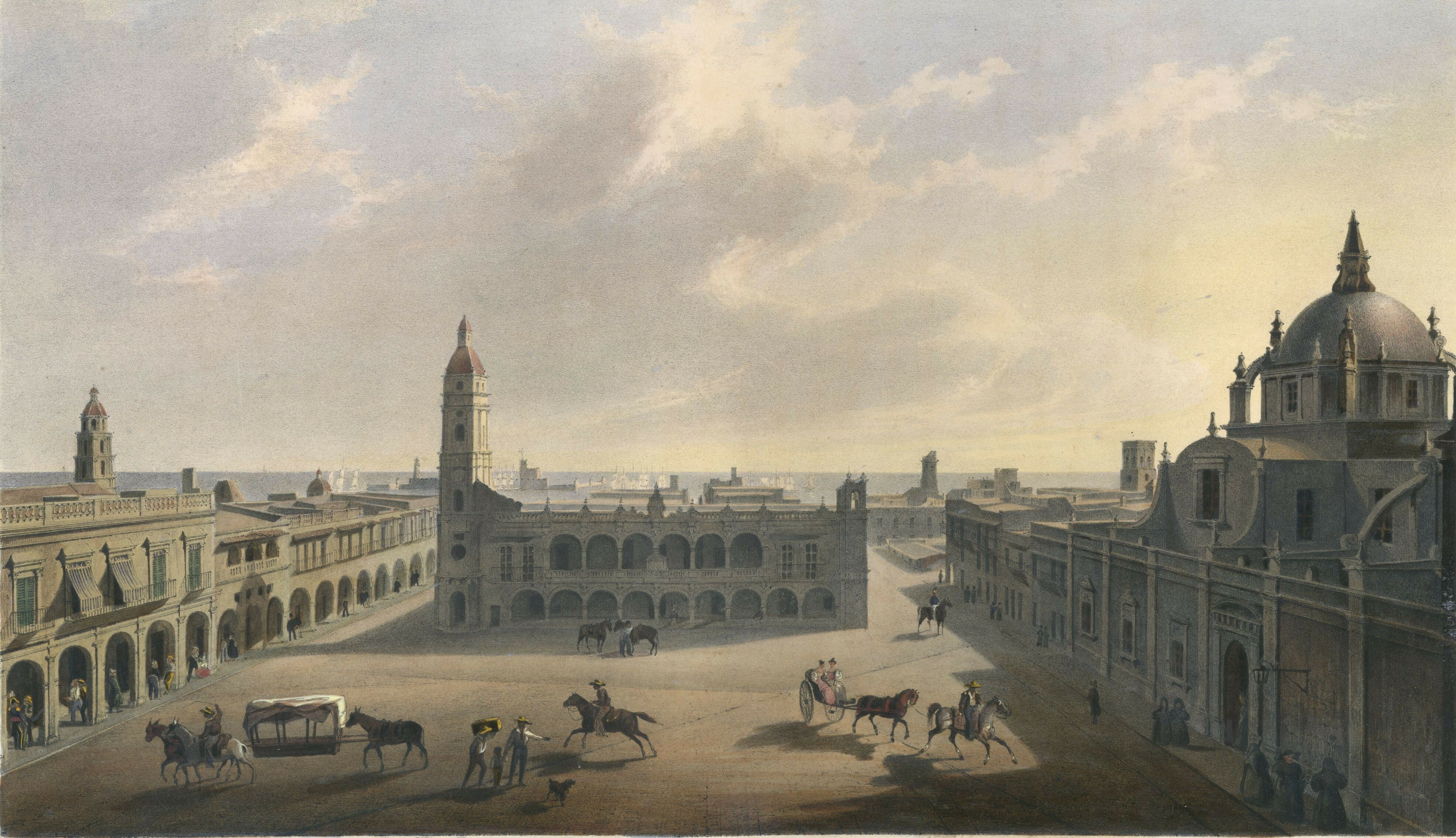
The Port of Veracruz in 1836.

=== Finance ===
The national debt increased throughout the Centralist republic as it generally did in Mexico throughout the nineteenth century. In June 1839, an understanding was reached with London bond holders to restructure Mexico's debt as the grounds for issuing new bonds.

The Banco de Avío, which had been founded in 1830, during the First Republic had limited success during the Centralist Republic, mainly in the field of textiles. The foundation of a national bank was further decreed in 1837. Its charter would eventually be annulled in 1841.

In 1842, a corporation of brokers known as the Colegio de Corredores was established as a liaison between brokers and merchants.

=== Trade ===
The Centralist Republic maintained the protectionist measures which under the First Republic had aimed to protect the Mexican cotton industry. By 1837, these measures had been expanded to include ginned cotton and cotton twist, and eventually foreign fabrics.

In 1841, mercantile courts were established in all the department capitals and ports open to foreign trade.

A line of British Royal Mail steamships began to traverse between Southampton, Veracruz, and Tampico in 1841.

=== Manufacturing ===
By 1843 there were 62 cotton factories with over two thousand looms in operation.

The Mexican textile industry continued to grow throughout this period so that by 1850, the price of clothing had dropped 70% from what it had been in 1831.

By 1845 there were six paper factories producing enough paper for the entire Mexican newspaper industry. Their entry into the manufacturing of writing paper then led to a substantial drop in its price.

=== Agriculture ===
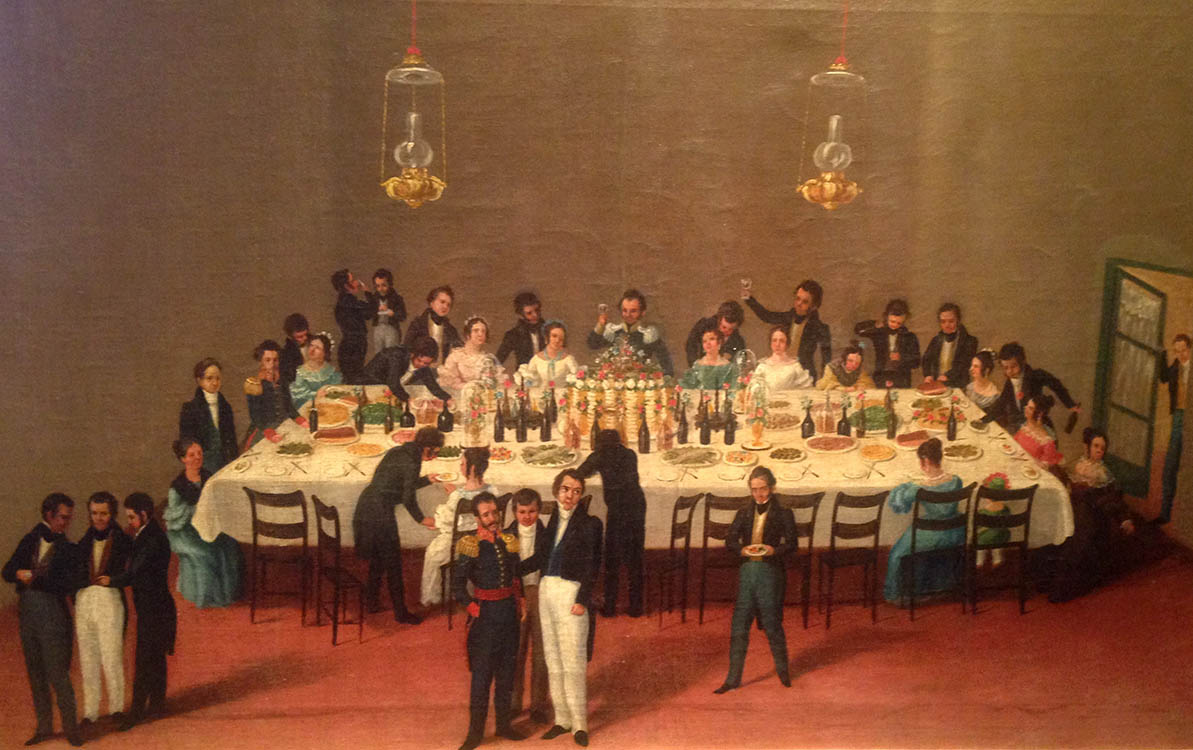
Banquet given in honor of General Antonio León in Oaxaca in 1844.

In 1837, the Centralist Republic nationalized the tobacco industry after the First Republic had briefly lifted the state monopoly on it. In 1844, a silk industry was begun in Morelia. An agricultural school was established by law in 1843.

=== Infrastructure ===
In 1842, President Santa Anna passed a tax for the purpose of constructing a railway between Mexico City and Veracruz and the work for the project was assigned to the contractor Antonio Garay, who constructed eight miles of tracks.

The first two commercial steamships owned by the Mexican government arrived at Veracruz in August 1842, while a third smaller one was acquired in 1845, being then used for transport from Veracruz to Sisal.

== See also ==
- History of democracy in Mexico
- List of constitutions of Mexico
- History of Mexico
- Pastry War
- Mexican–American War
- 1824 Constitution of Mexico
- Democracy in Mexico
