= Battle of Acajete =

1839 battle in the Mexican Federalist War

- Part of Urrea Rebellion
Date	3 May 1839
Location	Acajete, Veracruz
Result	Centralist victory

Belligerents
Centralists	Insurgents

Commanders and leaders
Gabriel Valencia	José de Urrea (WIA); José Antonio Mexía (POW) (executed)

Strength
1,600	~1,000

The Battle of Acajete was fought at Acajete, Veracruz on 3 May 1839 between insurgents under the joint command of José de Urrea and José Antonio Mexía and 1,600 Centrists under the command of General Gabriel Valencia. The centralist repelled all the charges of the insurgents and broke their army with an attack by their cavalry reserve. The insurgents lost, Mexia was captured and executed, and Urrea fled injured to Tampico. Over 600 soldiers died on both sides and several hundreds were captured by the centralists.

== Sources ==
- Jaques, Tony, ed. (2007), Dictionary of Battles and Sieges: A Guide to 8,500 Battles from Antiquity through the Twenty-first Century (3 volumes ed.), Greenwood Publishing Group, p. 5, ISBN 978-0-313-33536-5, LCCN 2006015366, OCLC 68786744, OL 10420610M
