= Bases Orgánicas =

Mexican constitutional changes of 1835–1836

Bases Orgánicas (English: Organic Bases) was the name given to the constitution of Mexico which came into effect in 1843. It was the second and final constitution attempted during the Centralist Republic of Mexico, after the Siete Leyes.

National instability had resulted in a coup which overthrew the presidency of Anastasio Bustamante at the end of 1841. The coup plotters led by Santa Anna had proclaimed the need for a new constitution, and held elections for a new constitutional congress. The newly elected congress however was not to the government's liking and it was subsequently dissolved in a self-coup at the end of 1842. A new government appointed a Council (Junta) of Notables that produced a new constitution on 12 June 1843.

== End of the Siete Leyes ==
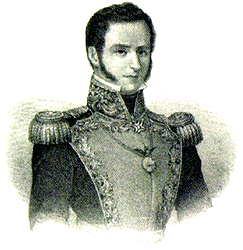
Minister of War José María Tornel: who dissolved congress at the behest of Santa Anna who was out of the capital, and not even nominal president at the time

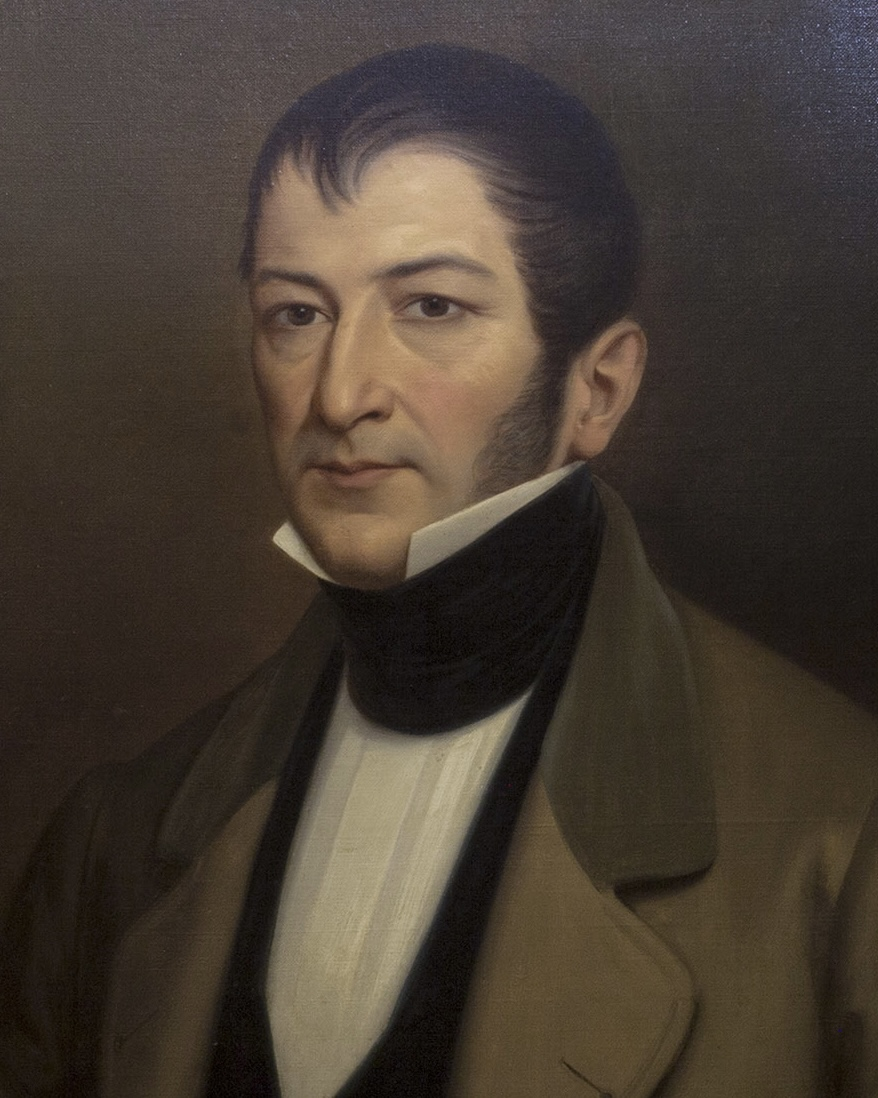
President Nicolás Bravo who was personally against dissolving congress but ultimately went along with it.

The Bases Orgánicas must be understood in the context of the nineteenth-century Mexican struggle between the conservative centralists and the liberal federalists. The first constitution of independent Mexico promulgated in 1824 was federalist. Subsequent political instability led to a new constitution in 1834, the Siete Leyes ("Seven Laws"), which marked the end of the First Mexican Republic and the beginning of the Centralist Republic of Mexico.

The political instability that marked the First Mexican Republic continued well into era of the Centralist Republic. There were many attempts by states to break away from the more autocratic, centralist system, culminating in the secession of Yucatan and Texas. There were also many rebellions in favor of restoring the federalist system. By 1841, a new coup was brewing, with the aim of preserving the centralist system, but under a new constitution.

=== Fall of the Bustamante Administration ===
On 8 August 1841 Mariano Paredes rose against the government of Anastasio Bustamante; when his insurgent troops reached the city of Tacubaya on the outskirts of Mexico City, they were joined by the forces of Santa Anna and Gabriel Valencia, who were also plotting against the Bustamante government.

After failing to put down the insurgency, Bustamante officially surrendered power through the Estanzuela Accords on 6 October 1841. A military junta was formed which wrote the Bases de Tacubaya, a plan that would radically restructure government, except for the judiciary. It also called for elections for a new constituent congress meant to write a new constitution.

=== Federalist Congress ===
The constituent congress installed on 10 June 1842 was strongly federalist, against the wishes of the organizers of the Bases de Tacubaya, who were strongly centralist. Santa Anna began to scheme to dissolve the congress and left Nicolás Bravo in charge of the presidency on 26 October 1842. Bravo was not in accord with Santa Anna's schemes; even though he was a centralist, he did not wish to overturn the results of the election. However, José María Tornel the minister of war was the real power at the capital at this time, being the favorite of Santa Anna

=== Centralist Dissolution of Congress ===
President Bravo assured a commission that had been sent by congress that he would accept the new constitution, and Congress continued working on its draft until its work was interrupted by a pronunciamiento instigated by Santa Anna through Tornel on 11 December 1842 in the town of Huejotzingo, calling for the dissolution of congress, and demanding the installation of a council of notables, elites who were to work on the new constitution. War Minister Tornel was among the conspirators promoting the revolution. In spite of his earlier reluctance to go against congress and reassurance to them of his support, at the decisive hour, Bravo sided with the insurrectionists. On December 19, he approved a decree, signed by the ministers Bocanegra, Velez, Gorostiza, and Tornel, to dissolve Congress and decree that were to be replaced by a Council of Notables.

The council lasted six months, during which time the Bases de Tacubaya had force as a provisional constitution. The executive would continue to function as it previously had. Another decree on December 23 declared that the Council of Notables would call itself the national legislature, and the eighty men who were to make it up were finally named.

== The Bases Orgánicas ==
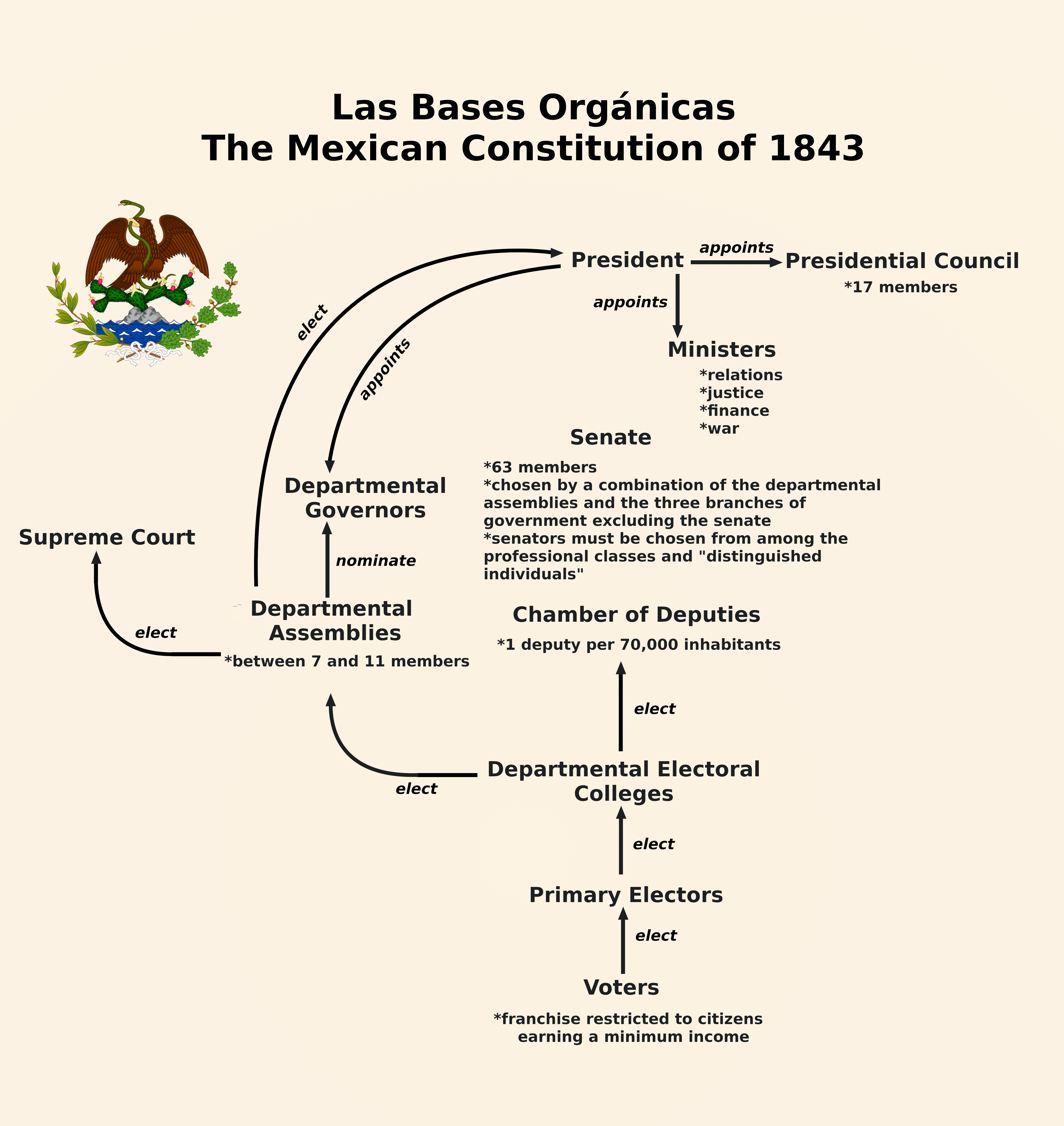
Diagram illustrating the government organized by the Bases Orgánicas

=== Suffrage ===
In order to vote a male citizen needed an annual income of two hundred pesos, which excluded most common laborers the right to vote. Each department was divided into legislative districts of five hundred inhabitants each in which qualified electors were to first choose a primary junta. The primary junta then chose one primary elector. The primary electors then voted for secondary electors of which there were to be one secondary elector for each twenty primary electors. The secondary electors made up the electoral college for each department. It was the electoral college that then elected deputies to congress and members of the departmental assembly.

=== Departments ===
The Bases Orgánicas continued the practice, first established in the Siete Leyes, of dividing the nation into political units now called departments, rather than into federal states. The departmental governors were appointed by the president from nominees submitted by the departmental assemblies. The departmental assemblies were popularly elected yet were essentially confined to administering policing powers, and subject to review by the centrally appointed governors.

=== Executive ===
The president was to be elected by the departmental assemblies to a term of five years. He was given substantial veto powers over congress and through exceptional powers was allowed to pass local legislation applying to the departments.

He appointed the seventeen members of a presidential council authorized to propose to the government any regulations that might be deemed necessary for the public welfare in any branch of the administration. The president also appointed the four ministers made up of justice, finance, war, and relations.

=== Legislature ===
The legislative power was vested in a bicameral congress made up of a chamber of deputies and a senate. The chamber of deputies was elected by the departmental electoral colleges and was to be made up of one deputy per seventy thousand inhabitants. The senate was to be made up of 63 members with two thirds being elected by the departmental assemblies from among landed gentry, miner owners, merchants, and manufacturers. The remaining third was to be elected by the chamber of deputies, the president, and the supreme court from distinguished individuals.

=== Judiciary ===
The judicial power was to be exercised through a Supreme Court, with local courts below it, and in a perpetual court martial appointed by the President.
