= List of constitutions of Mexico =

Since declaring independence in 1821, Mexico has adopted a number of constitutions or other documents of basic law with constitutional effects. Not all these can be considered constitutions, and not all of them enjoyed universal application. Those enacted in 1824, 1857, and 1917 are generally considered full-fledged, operational constitutions. The Constitution of 1824 established the framework of a federated republic, following the short-lived monarchy of Agustín de Iturbide (in 1821–22). The Constitution of 1857 was the framework set by Mexican liberals that incorporated particular laws into the constitution. The Constitution of 1917 was drafted by the faction that won the Mexican Revolution, known as the Constitutionalists for their adherence to the Constitution of 1857. It strengthened the anticlerical framework of the 1857 constitution, empowered the state to expropriate private property, and set protections for organized labor. The 1917 Constitution was significantly revised in 1992 under Carlos Salinas de Gortari, eliminating anticlerical restrictions and strengthening private property rights against the State.

Name	In force	Form of state	Legislature	Repeal	Observations
Constitution of Apatzingán	Proposed 1814; never came into effect	War of Independence	Congress of Chilpancingo	Death of José María Morelos	The Constitution of Apatzingan never actually entered into force. Almost a year after it was enacted, its proposer, José María Morelos y Pavón was imprisoned and was shot on December 22, 1815.
Federal Constitution of the United Mexican States of 1824	1824–35, 1847–57	Federal Republic	Constituent Congress	On December 29, 1835	This is considered the first official constitution of Mexico. On December 29, 1835 interim president José Justo Corro issued the Seven Constitutional Laws which replaced the Constitution.
Seven Constitutional Laws	1836–43	Central Republic	Congress	On July 12, 1843	Superseded when the Organic Bases were enacted, which granted dictatorial power to Antonio López de Santa Anna
Organic Bases of the Mexican Republic	1843–47	Central Republic	Antonio Lopez de Santa Anna	On August 22, 1846	The organic bases were repealed during the Mexican–American War, and the 1824 Constitution restored.
Federal Constitution of the United Mexican States of 1857	1857–1917	Federal Republic	Extraordinary Congress	On February 5, 1917	This constitution is considered the second official constitution of Mexico. This constitution replaced the Constitution of 1824 on February 5, 1857, and added several new laws such as the Reform Laws.
Political Constitution of the United Mexican States	1917–present	Federal Republic	Constituent Congress	Currently in force	This constitution is considered the third official constitution of Mexico. This constitution replaced the Constitution of 1857 as a result of the Mexican Revolution. This constitution has been amended numerous times. It is the longest-lasting constitution of Mexico.
