= Ignacio Rodríguez Galván =

Mexican writer (1816–1842)

Ignacio Rodríguez Galván (22 March 1816–25 July 1842) is considered to be the first Mexican Romantic writer. He was born in Tizayuca, Hidalgo, Mexico in 1816 and died in Havana, Cuba in 1842 at age 26 from yellow fever. During his short life, much of his poetry and plays were concerned with the political situation in Mexico and include works such as the poem Profecía de Guatimoc, Al baile del señor Presidente, Adiós, oh patria mía and La gota de hiel. He also founded a newspaper called Año Nuevo, writing for it as well.

The Ignacio Rodríguez Galván International Poetry Festival is held annually in his hometown of Tizayuca.
