= Siete Leyes =

Mexican constitutional changes of 1835–1836

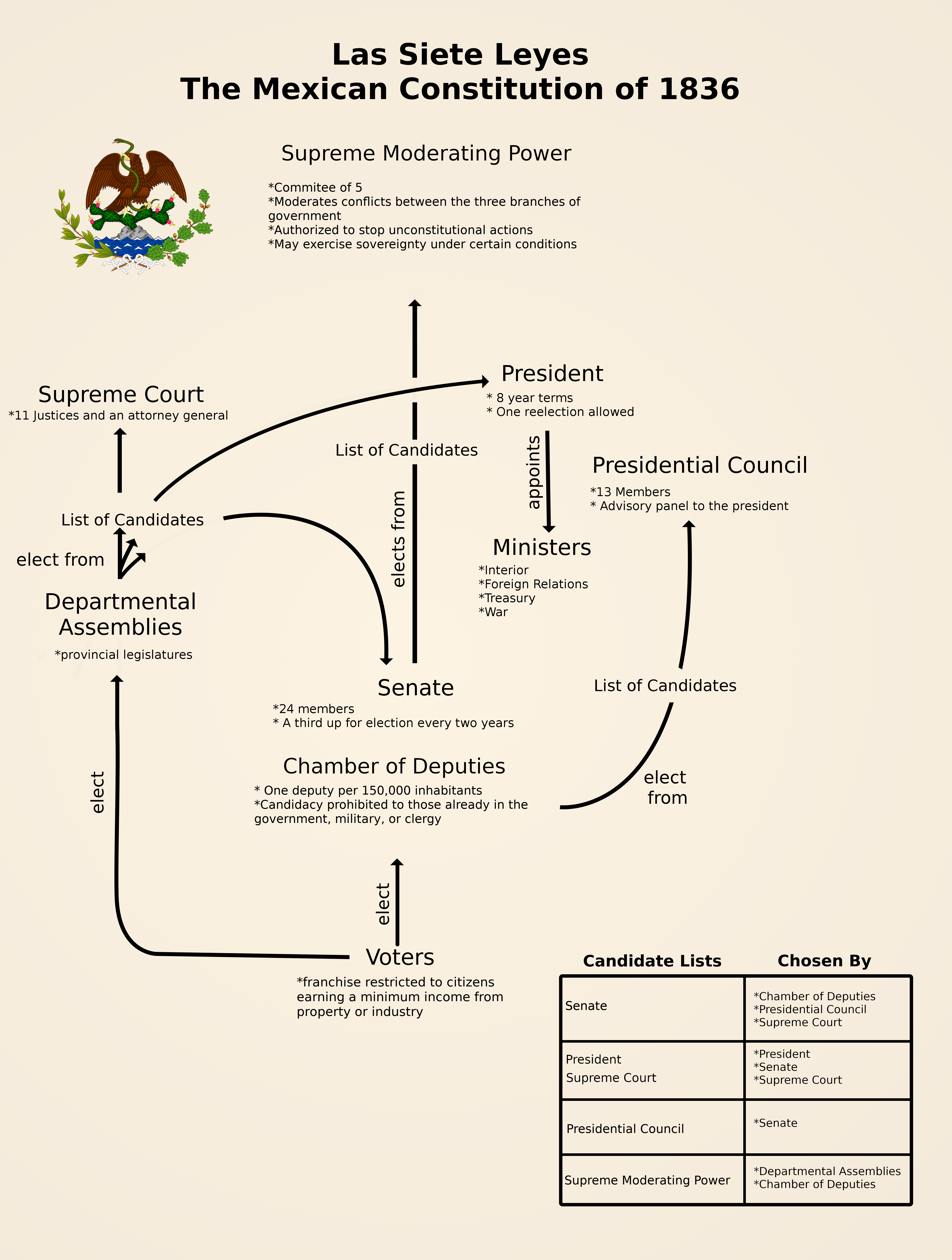
Diagram illustrating the government organized by the Siete Leyes

Las Siete Leyes (Spanish: [las ˈsjete ˈleʝes], or Seven Laws was a constitution that fundamentally altered the organizational structure of Mexico, away from the federal structure established by the Constitution of 1824, thus ending the First Mexican Republic and creating a unitary republic, the Centralist Republic of Mexico. Formalized under President Antonio López de Santa Anna on 15 December 1835, they were enacted in 1836. The Seven Laws curtailed the autonomy of states, turning them into mere departments with governors appointed by the president. They were intended to centralize and strengthen the national government. The aim of the previous constitution was to create a political system that would emulate the success of the United States, but after a decade of political turmoil, economic stagnation, and threats and actual foreign invasion, conservatives concluded that a better path for Mexico was centralized power.

1. The 15 articles of the first law granted citizenship to those who could read Spanish and had an annual income of 100 pesos, except for male domestic workers, who did not have the right to vote, nor did women of any class.
2. The second law allowed the President to close Congress and suppress the Supreme Court of Justice of the Nation. Military officers were not allowed to assume this office.
3. The 58 articles of the third law established a bicameral Congress of Deputies and Senators, elected by governmental organs. Deputies had four-year terms; Senators were elected for six years.
4. The 34 articles of the fourth law specified that the Supreme Court, the Senate of Mexico, and the Meeting of Ministers each nominate three candidates, and the lower house of the legislature would select from those nine candidates the President and Vice-president,
5. The fifth law had an 11-member Supreme Court elected in the same manner as the President and vice-president.
6. The 31 articles of the sixth Law replaced the federal republic's nominally-sovereign "states" with centralized "departments", fashioned after the French model, whose governors and legislators were designated by the President.
7. The seventh law prohibited reverting to the pre-reform laws for six years.

Las Siete Leyes were replaced in 1843 by the Bases Orgánicas.
