= Baluarte de Santiago =

Fortification in Veracruz, Mexico

Bastion of Santiago
- Baluarte de Santiago
- Veracruz, Veracruz, Mexico
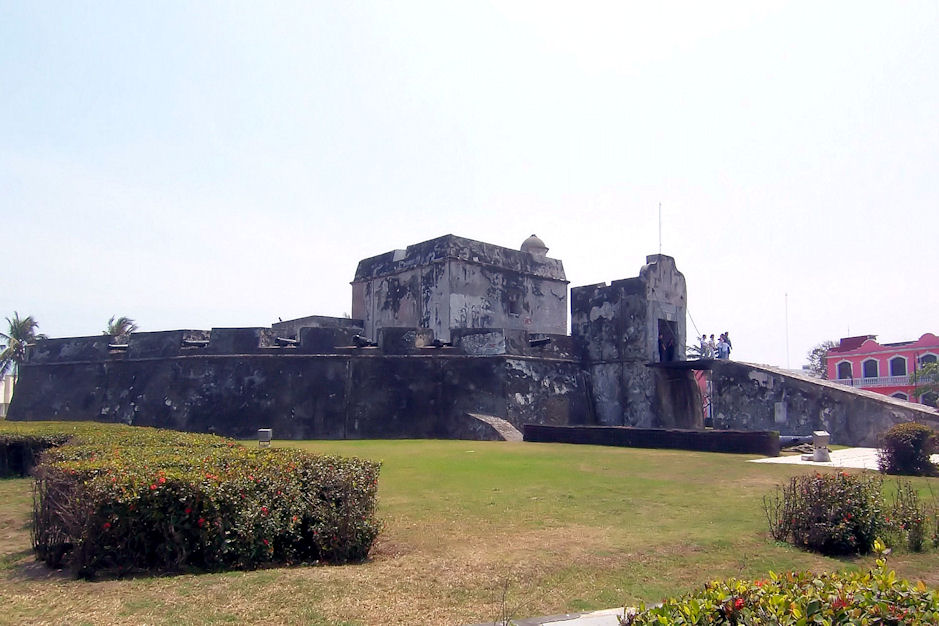

Site information
- Type: Bastion
- Owner: INAH
- Open to the public: No, temporarily closed
- Status: Museo Baluarte de Santiago

Location
- Coordinates: 19°11′53.16″N 96°7′59.88″W

Site history
- Built: 1635
- Built for: Protection of the walled city of Veracruz

The Baluarte de Santiago (Spanish for "Bastion of Santiago"), also known as the Bastion of Gunpowder, is located on Street Francisco Canal S/N, between Avenues Gómez Farías and 16 Septiembre, in the port city of Veracruz, Veracruz, Mexico.

It is the only surviving bastion of nine that guards the port of pirate and corsairs attacks.

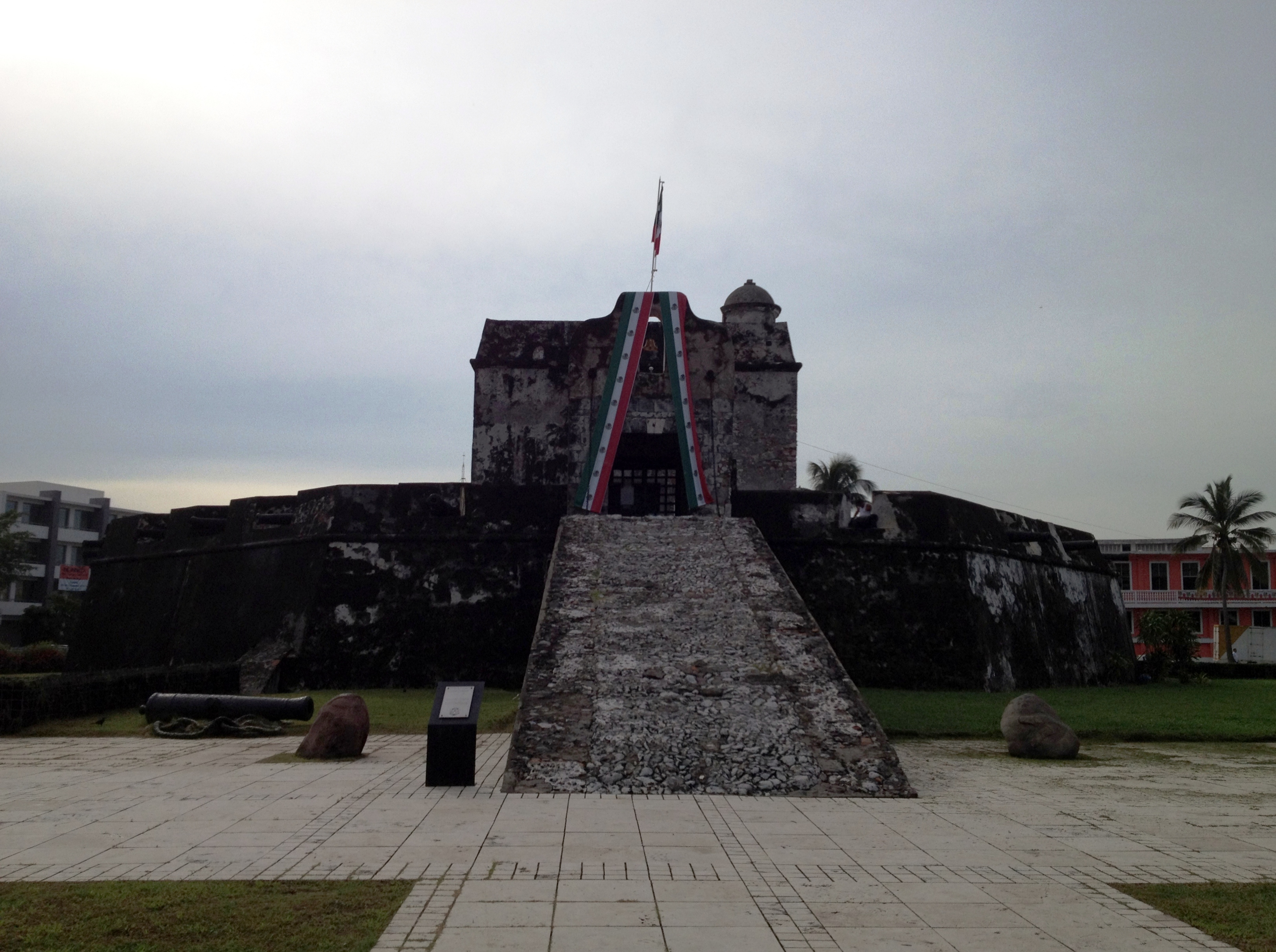
General view of the Bastion of Santiago in the port city of Veracruz

== History ==
It is a military building that was completed in 1635. The Baluarte de Santiago was part of the construction of seven bastions that would form the defensive system of the walled city of Veracruz. The bastion was located at the southern tip of the walled city, off the coast of the Gulf of Mexico. Between the 17th and 19th centuries, the system of bastions protected the city from pirate attacks.

In 1990, the bastion was conditioned to become a museum, which opened in 1991 and remained and has remained as such since then, being called Museo Baluarte de Santiago.

== Joyas del Pescador ==
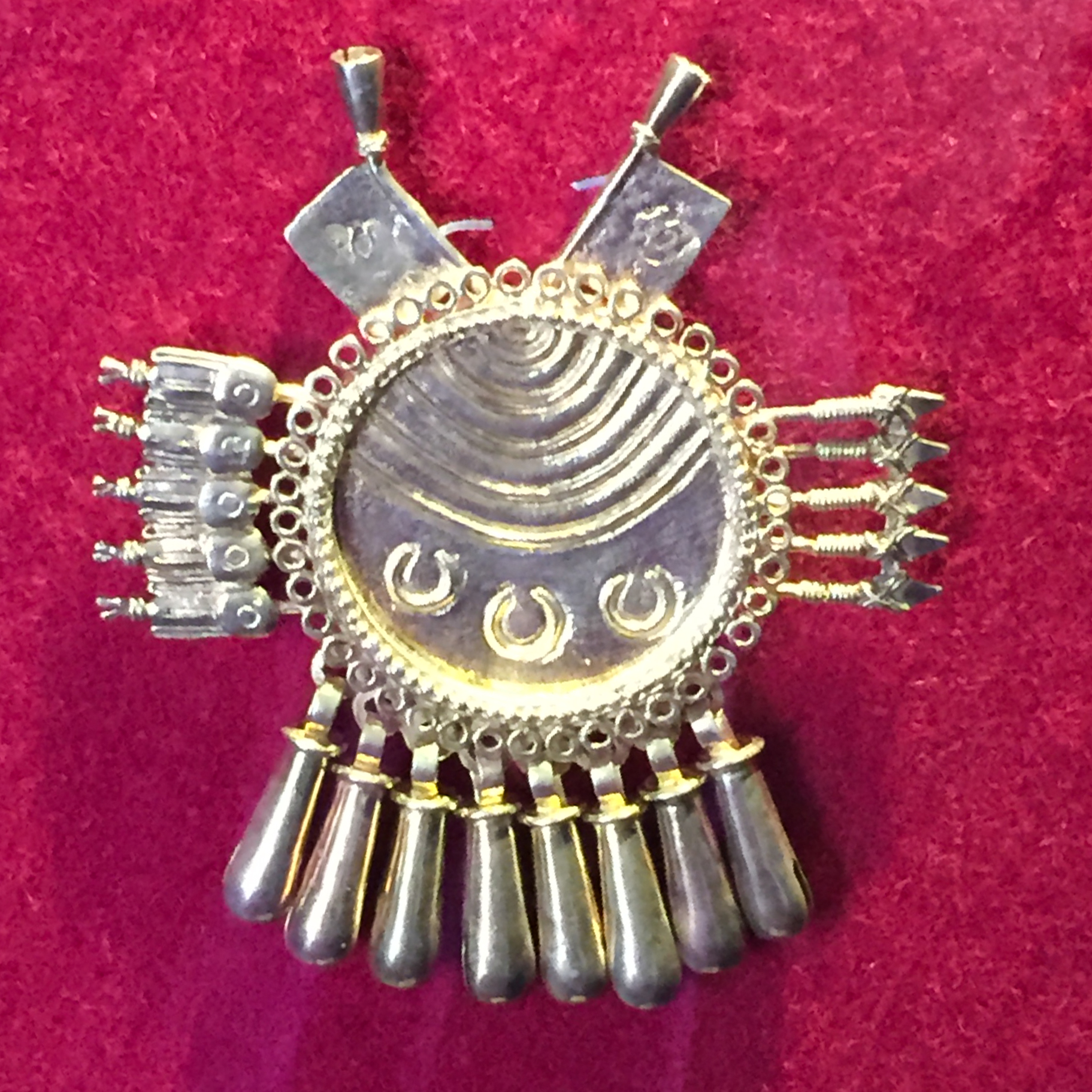
Chimalli, part of the Joyas del Pescador

The Joyas del Pescador (the Fisherman's Jewels) are Prehispanic pieces of jewelry found by the octopus fisherman Raúl Hurtado in 1976 about 20 km north of the city of Veracruz, in a Colonial Spanish shipwreck. The fisherman soon had to sell the jewels, which were sold to a jeweler, which melted some of the pieces into graduation rings. At this moment, the police was searching for jewelry theft in the city, which led to the founding of the jewels, who were noticed that the jewels were of different manufacture.

The jewels were suspected to have an archaeological background, which was further confirmed by specialists from the University of Veracruz and INAH. The pieces were then recovered and have become the property of INAH. The treasure consisted of 42 gold pieces of Mixtec origin in their original form, plus another 23 gold pieces melted by the jeweler, consisting of a total of 65 pieces, which together weigh more than 7 kg.

The Joyas del Pescador has been exhibited in the Museo Baluarte de Santiago since 1991, and has remained this day as a permanent exhibition.
