= Alejandro Arango y Escandón =

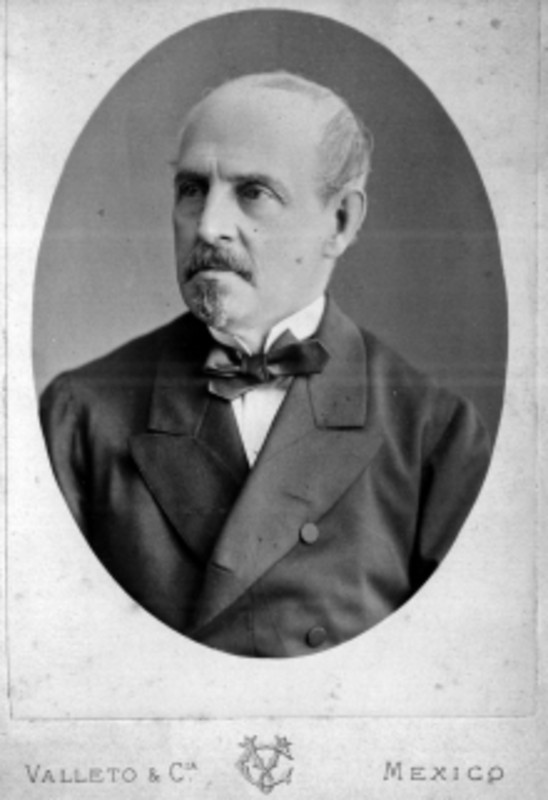
- Born: July 10, 1821; Puebla
- Died: February 28, 1883
- Occupations: Poet, lawyer, librarian

Alejandro Arango y Escandón (July 10, 1821 – February 28, 1883) was a Mexican author, librarian, and lawyer.

== Biography ==
Alejandro Arango y Escandón was born on July 10, 1821 in Puebla City. He was educated in Madrid and Paris, and filled several high offices, but declined to accept any compensation for his public services. His library was one of the richest in Mexico. A volume of poems and the Ensayo historico sobre Fray Luis de Leon are among his best works. The latter won him membership in both the Royal Spanish Academy and the academy of history of Spain. Alejandro Arango y Escandón died on 28 February 1883 in Mexico City.
