= José Justo Corro =

President of Mexico from 1836 to 1837

The Most Excellent José Justo Corro
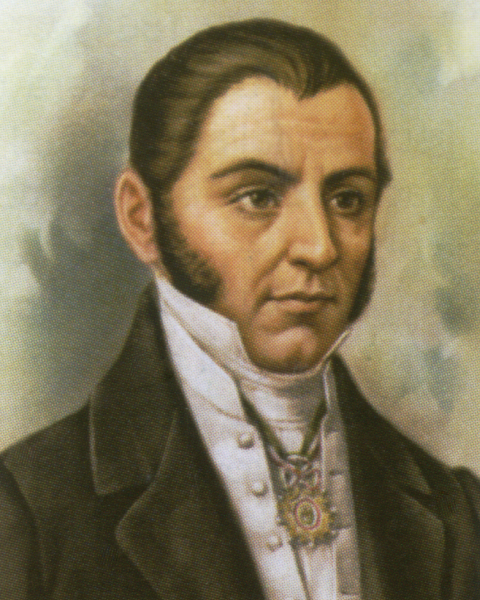
- Portrait made by Cruces & Campas, circa 19th century

10th President of Mexico
- In office 28 February 1836 – 19 April 1837
- Preceded by: Miguel Barragán
- Succeeded by: Anastasio Bustamante

Minister of Justice and Ecclesiastical Affairs
- In office 18 May 1835 – 27 February 1836
- President: Miguel Barragán
- Preceded by: José Mariano Blasco
- Succeeded by: Joaquín de Iturbide

Governor of Jalisco
- In office November 1837 – December 1837
- Preceded by: Antonio Escobedo
- Succeeded by: Antonio Escobedo
- In office 24 September 1828 – 28 February 1829
- Preceded by: Juan Nepomuceno Cumplido
- Succeeded by: José Ignacio Cañedo y Arróniz

Personal details
- Born: c. 18 July 1794 Guadalajara, Nueva Galicia, Viceroyalty of New Spain (now Jalisco, Mexico)
- Died: c. 18 December 1864 (aged 70) Guadalajara, Jalisco, Second Mexican Empire
- Resting place: Panteón de Belén
- Party: Liberal Party; Conservative Party (Presidency)

José Justo Corro y Silva (c. 19 July 1794 – c. 18 December 1864) was a Mexican lawyer and statesman who was made president of Mexico on 2 March 1836, after the sudden death of President Miguel Barragán. During his administration, he oversaw the transition from the First Mexican Republic to the Centralist Republic of Mexico and the publication of the new constitution: the Siete Leyes. The nation also faced the ongoing Texas Revolution, and Mexican independence was recognized by Spain and by the Holy See.

== Early life and education ==
José Justo Corro y Silva was born on 18 July 1794, in the city of Guadalajara, the capital of what is now the state of Jalisco. His parents were financially comfortable and descended from Mexican nobility. He began his public life as a provincial ensign in 1810 and had reached the rank of captain lieutenant colonel when he took part in the Mexican War of Independence. He went to law school in Guadalajara before moving to Mexico City and made a name for himself in the capital as a lawyer.

== Career ==
=== Early positions ===
Corro served as a deputy in Jalisco's Constituent Congress, which held its first session on 14 September 1823. While there, he participated in the drafting and signing of the state's constitution, which was promulgated on 18 November 1824. Corro was part of the congress's treasury commission, where he and other legislators opposed classification of the General Congress's income, due to his and Jalisco's support of federalism. He then served as the governor of Jalisco from 1828 to 1829. (Note: Different sources cite different start and end dates for his term, including: 22 September 1828 - 1 May 1829; 23 September 1828 - 28 February 1829; 24 September 1828 - 28 February 1829)

On 26 January 1835, incumbent president Antonio López de Santa Anna attempted to step down, but congress did not immediately accept his resignation. Vice president Valentín Gómez Farías was removed from power and his office abolished the following day, and on 28 January, General Miguel Barragán became president. Barragán appointed Corro as minister of justice and ecclesiastical affairs on 18 May 1835, a position in which he served until 27 February 1836. Barragán died of typhus on 1 March 1836, just after resigning office on 27 February due to ill health, with Santa Anna again absent from the capital (this time fighting rebels in Texas). Under those circumstances, the Chamber of Deputies on 27 February 1836 named Corro interim president. He formally took office on 2 March.

== Presidency ==

Cabinet of José Justo Corro
Office	Name	Term
Relations	José María Ortiz Monasterio	27 February 1836 – 19 April 1837
Justice	Joaquín de Iturbide	27 February 1836 – 19 April 1837
Treasury	Rafael Mangino	27 February 1836 – 20 September 1836
Ignacio Alas	21 September 1836 – 18 December 1836
José María Cervantes	19 December 1836 – 19 April 1837
War	José María Tornel	27 February 1836 – 18 April 1837
Ignacio del Corral	18 April 1837 – 19 April 1837

He had been president for three months when news arrived of the Battle of San Jacinto, the defeat of Mexico by the Texans, and the capture of Santa Anna. Corro made patriotic appeals to aid the troops and save the president and laid out a plan for which the government could raise more funds. To the Mexican Navy were added a few vessels, and reinforcements were sent out to Texas by the end of 1836.

At Puebla appeared a prounciamniento, the Plan of Concordia, calling for the unity of all parties, but it did not seriously threaten the government. Towards the end of 1836, former conservative President arrived back in the nation after an exile in Europe, and public opinion began to favor him for the presidency.

=== Foreign relations ===
The government at this time had to deal with many foreign crises, most apparent of all the Texas Revolution, and threats that the United States would recognize Texan independence. France had put forth claims of damages, which would eventually lead to the Pastry War in 1838. Due to rising tensions, Manuel Eduardo de Gorostiza, the Mexican minister to the United States was summoned back to Mexico. In response to the seizure of American merchant ships, the Mexican brigantine ‘General Urrea’ had been captured by American vessels, and the latter had been forced to lower the Mexican colors and fly the American flag. Wishing to avoid a war, the Mexican government ordered a release of captured vessels.

In March 1837, the new ambassador of France in Mexico received a message from his government claiming damages that had not been addressed by the Mexican government with the warning that if they were continued to be ignored they would result in war between France and Mexico. When the ambassador arrived in Mexico he was received by President Corro, and Minister José María Tornel held many banquets for him. In a proclamation Corro assured that he would not be intimidated by foreign interests. A newspaper published a letter by the French ambassador with maps showcasing recent French triumphs in Algeria, meant to show off French military capability.

The Corro administration was successful in getting the Holy See to recognize Mexican independence, under the condition that the anti-clerical laws, established in 1833 by president Valentín Gómez Farías, would be lifted. The pope then resolved to send an internuncio. On 28 December 1836, Spain also recognized Mexican independence though news of this would not arrive in Mexico until Corro was no longer president. Representing Mexico during the negotiations in Madrid was Miguel Santa Maria who would remain in Spain as Mexico's foreign representative.

=== Domestic issues ===
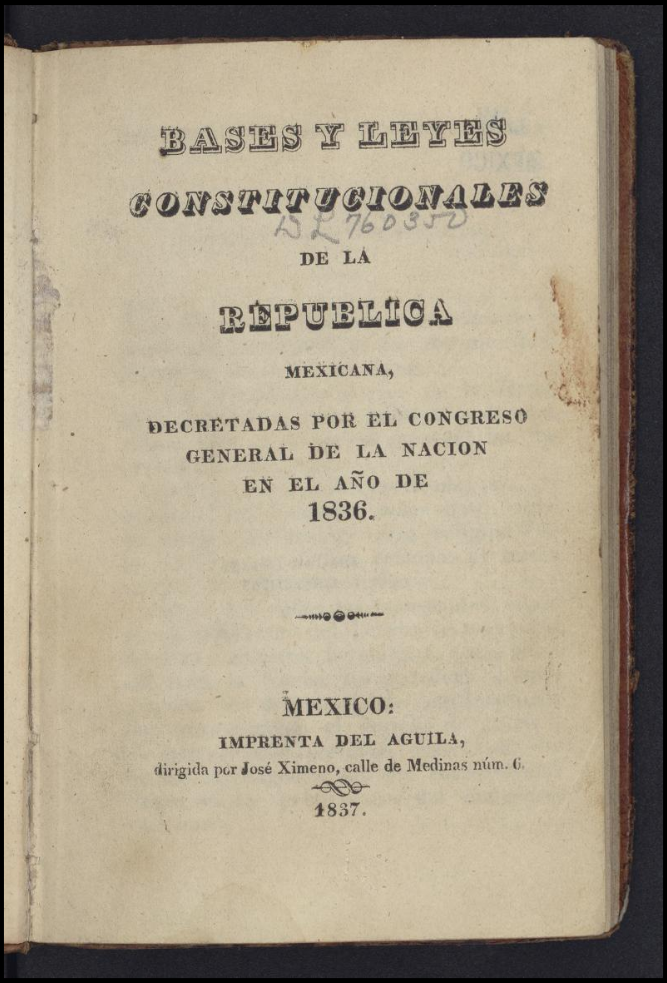
The Siete Leyes of 1836, implemented during Corro's presidency

In the course of his presidency Corro would have three ministers of finance – Mangino, Alas and Cervantes – who all struggled to raise funds, and who all appealed the government to take out foreign loans. The use of copper also caused trouble as it lent itself easily to counterfeiting, which Corro tried to discourage by devaluing the value of the copper coin. To alleviate the financial chaos, a National Bank was also established, but it struggled due to a lack of funds. Urban properties had avoided paying taxes since independence, and the Corro administration on 30 June 1836, decreed that they now had to pay two pesos for every thousand pesos in value which they had.

Partisan conflict on the municipal level resulted in a petition to the president to suspend the elections for the Ayuntamientos until the publication of the Siete Leyes, the new constitution that was being worked on. After suppressing the revolt of Juan Alvarez in the south of the country, congress began focusing on this new, centralist constitution. The Siete Leyes were finally published on 30 December 1836. It revoked anticlerical laws previously passed by Gómez Farías, but maintained state control over the church.

Elections were held in accordance with the new constitution, and the ex-president Anastasio Bustamante who had recently returned from Europe, succeeded in winning another term.

== Later life ==
Corro stepped down on 19 April 1837, being succeeded by Bustamante. He then returned to Jalisco, and again served as interim governor of Jalisco from 1 November to 30 December 1837. In 1839 he served as a deputy in and then president of the state congress. Corro then served as an alternate deputy to the Constituent Congress of 1842.

Corro then retired to private life in Guadalajara. He died there on 18 December 1864. His body was interred in the Panteón de Belén. He was married to Juana Fernanda Ulloa. There is a street named after Corro in Guadalajara.

== See also ==
- List of heads of state of Mexico

== Notes ==
Political offices
Preceded by Miguel Barragán	President of Mexico; 28 February 1836 – 19 April 1837	Succeeded by Anastasio Bustamante
