= Manga de Clavo =

Property of the 8th President of Mexico, Antonio López de Santa Anna

Coordinates: 19.2333°N 96.3500°W

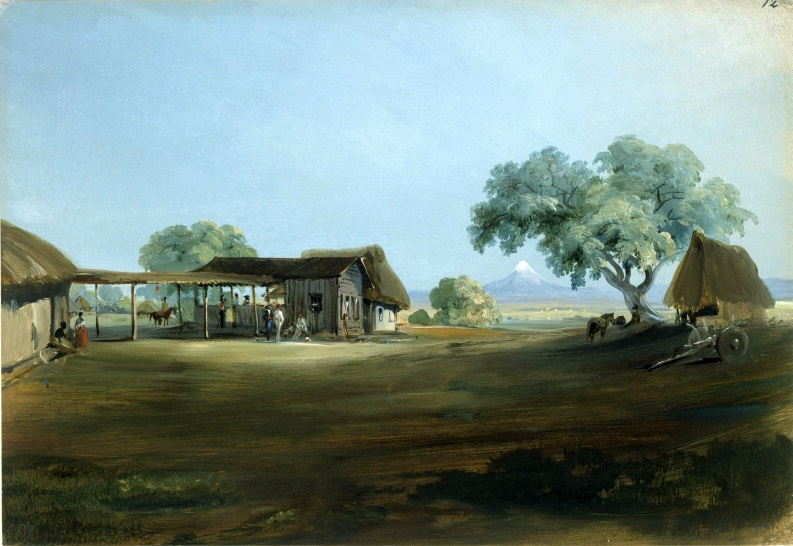
Johann Moritz Rugendas, Manga de Clavo. Hacienda of General Santa Anna. Kuperferstichkabinett, Staatliche Museen zu Berlin, Id. Number: VIII E. 2440, 1831–1834.

Manga de Clavo was one of the most famous properties and preferred hacienda of Antonio López de Santa Anna, a historic site from the first half of the nineteenth century where he lived and made decisions that defined Mexican politics of its time, serving effectively as presidential residence and government house until it was burned and partially destroyed by the invading United States Army during the Mexican–American War in 1847–1848.

Impossible to think of Santa Anna without thinking Manga de Clavo.

== History ==
Santa Anna acquired the hacienda of Manga de Clavo in 1825 shortly before marrying María Inés de la Paz García his first wife, daughter of wealthy Spanish parents from Alvarado (Veracruz). During the years in which his influence grew in the region of Veracruz—occupying different positions, including the presidency of the Republic on six occasions, between 1833 and 1855—he enlarged it in size and beauty. His estate not only maintained a privileged strategic location but also of military, political and commercial importance. The economic production of Santa Anna's properties, which included multiple villages dedicated to livestock, served the entire area between Veracruz and Jalapa, placed just at the fork of major roads leading to Mexico City, either by the Royal Highway to Jalapa or the one going to Orizaba.

Also, in the lands of Manga de Clavo is where General Santa Anna's left leg was first buried, lost after being severely wounded by the French during the Pastry War, at the Veracruz dock gateway on December 5, 1838. The limb remained at his hacienda before it was transferred to the cemetery of Santa Paula in Mexico City, on the anniversary of the achievement of Mexican Independence, September 27, 1842.

For Santa Anna this was a place of rest, pleasure and entertainment, suitable for intrigue and conspiracy, as well as refuge in adversity and defeat. Countless times he took the road to Manga de Clavo from the capital withdrawing from the responsibility of governing, abandoning presidential power to retreat to the tranquility of his domain.

To Santa Anna fate was ungrateful, it betrayed him, presenting the line on the horizon as an illusion. By crossing the threshold at the limit, he irredeemably had to go back to the starting point. This Mexican Sisyphus found himself in a lost dimension—on a constant replay—marching back and forth between National Palace and Manga de Clavo, trapped in the eternal return and unable to break the curse.

Amongst the most prominent foreigners who visited Manga de Clavo is the Marquise Calderón de la Barca, wife of Angel Calderon de la Barca, minister plenipotentiary of Spain in Mexico from 1839 to 1842. In her book "Life in Mexico", Calderón gives an account of the journey made from Veracruz to Manga de Clavo and the reception she had from Santa Anna and his family, this being one of the few examples and most famous description that exists of the hacienda:

We arrived about five at Manga de Clavo, after passing through leagues of natural garden, the property of Santa Anna. The house is pretty, slight-looking, and kept in nice order. We were received by an aide-de-camp in uniform, and by several officers, and conducted to a large, cool, agreeable apartment, with little furniture [...] In a little while entered General Santa Anna himself; a gentlemanly, good-looking, quietly-dressed, rather melancholy-looking person, with one leg [...] He has a sallow complexion, fine dark eyes, soft and penetrating, and an interesting expression of face. We then proceeded to look at the out-houses and offices; There are no gardens, but, as he observed, the whole country, which for twelve leagues square belongs to him, is a garden.

Although the importance of this site began to decline due to Santa Anna's frequent absences, María Inés' death in 1844 and the 1847–1858 invasion of the United States marked the beginning of its downfall. After the uprisings that began with the Plan of Ayutla revolution, forcing Santa Anna into definitive exile in 1855, some of his properties were confiscated, most of the land was sold and soon Manga de Clavo was lost to landscape and memory.

Subsequently, some indications prove that the hacienda survived to the last decade of the nineteenth century, before the Mexican Revolution and the execution of its agricultural policies that ceased large estates and extensive lands, divided and reduced in many cases only to its main enclosure or manor house. Therefore, it can be inferred that between the years of 1920 and 1940, Manga de Clavo's process of disappearing and becoming a ruin accelerated, with the hacienda consuming itself until it was buried in the national unconscious.

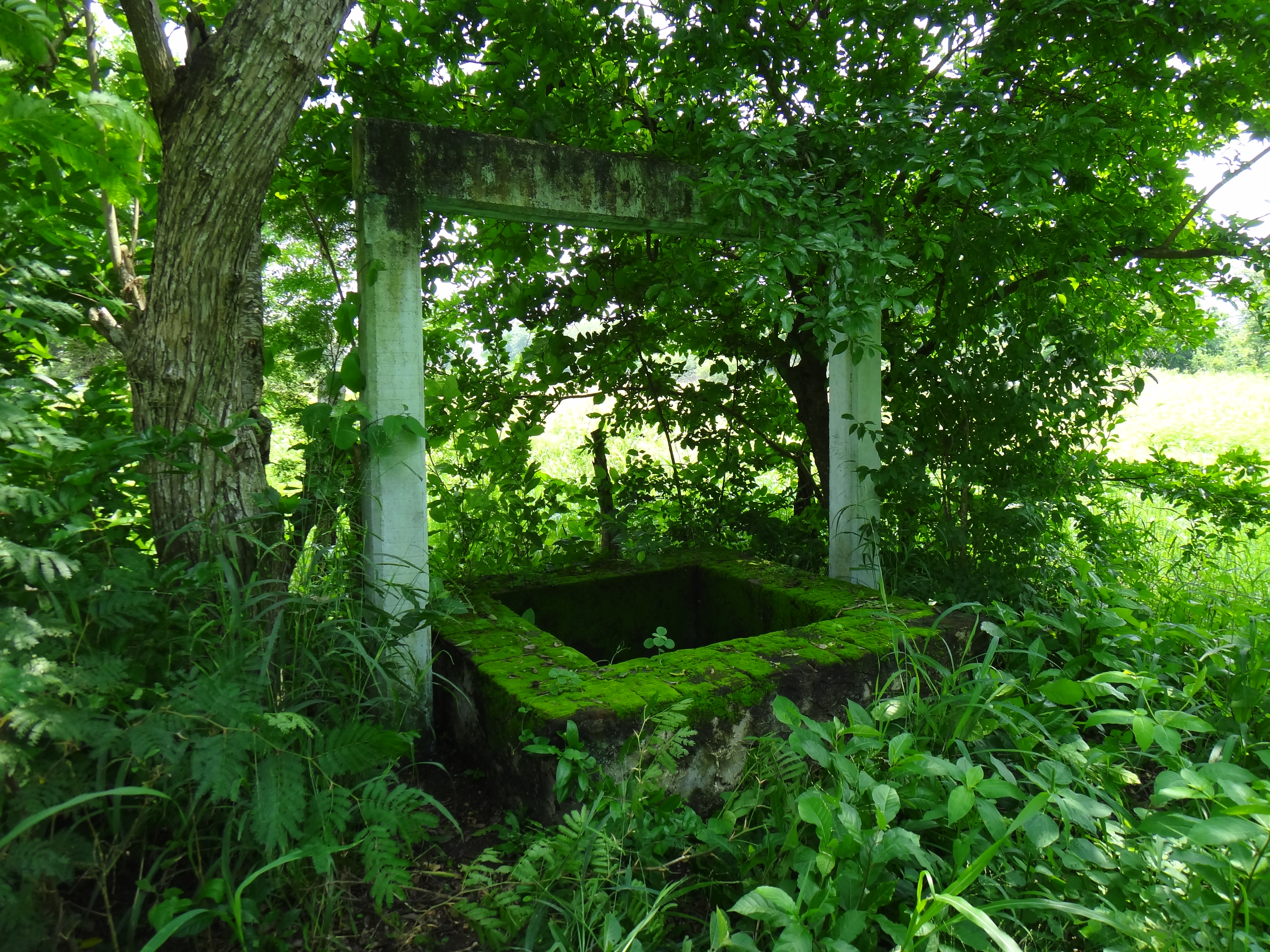
Surviving well at Manga de Clavo. Photo: Hugo Fernández de Castro, July 2014

== Location ==
In the early twentieth century, the remains of Manga de Clavo gave birth to the town of Vargas which grew irregularly around the hacienda, appropriating its stone and obliterating signs of its true origin. Thus, the mansion and adjacent outbuildings were gradually destroyed, to the point that only ruins could be found at ground level, virtually ceasing to exist.

This circumstance has led to the spreading of misleading information about the original and exact location of the property, erroneously expressed by enthusiastic chroniclers of the subject-matter and local townspeople in the region, but also found in history books, archives, web pages, social media sites and even TV shows. Manga de Clavo is still being confused with other properties of Santa Anna: the hacienda of El Lencero in the outskirts of Jalapa, and the remnants of a residence and barracks in the vicinity of Puente Nacional, very close to the historic Puente Nacional bridge.

The site where the estate of Manga de Clavo currently stands is located in the town of Vargas, 19 miles from the port of Veracruz in the municipality and state of the same name. Only a few foundations, scattered stones and a well survive, remains that Roberto Williams Garcia—prominent academic researcher of cultural Veracruz—was able to visit in 1967:

I asked for Manga de Clavo and was pointed to a couple of hundred meters from the railway, adjacent to wooden shacks within a low-rise thin brush [...] Nearby is "The Well of Santa Anna" without curbstone and sixty eight feet deep, with some sort of door half way down – which I was informed – lead to a passage, a tunnel ...
