= Zacatecas rebellion of 1835 =

Mexican revolt

Zacatecas Rebellion of 1834
- Part of Revolts against the Centralist Republic of Mexico
Date	11 April 1835
Location	Zacatecas
Result	Centralist victory •Creation of The Aguascalientes Territory

Belligerents
Centralists	Zacatecan rebels

Commanders and leaders
Antonio Lopez de Santa Anna	Francisco García Salinas

Strength
3,400	4,000

Casualties and losses
100 killed	250 killed 2,723 captured

The Rebellion in Zacatecas of 1835 was part of the Mexican Federalist War between Mexican centralists and federalists during the first half of the nineteenth century during the administration of Antonio Lopez de Santa Anna.

== Background ==
Following the failure of the federal system, centralism gained ground and Congress amended the Constitution of 1824 to create a centralist republic, limiting the power of states and reducing the military.

These events led to a rebellion in Zacatecas. The governor himself, Francisco García Salinas, led an army of about 4,000 men against the government. To end the rebels, President Santa Anna in person went to fight, leaving the presidency in charge of General Miguel Barragán.

García Salinas was defeated in the Battle of Zacatecas (1835). Santa Anna allowed his troops to loot the city, then, and as punishment for the rebellion, the state of Zacatecas lost part of its territory, which formed the state of Aguascalientes.

This military action removed the final obstacles to centralism and led to the constitution of December 30, 1835, known as Siete Leyes, which limited the right to vote and removed the political and financial autonomy previously held by Mexican states.
