= Battle of Zacatecas (1835) =

- Part of Rebellion in Zacatecas
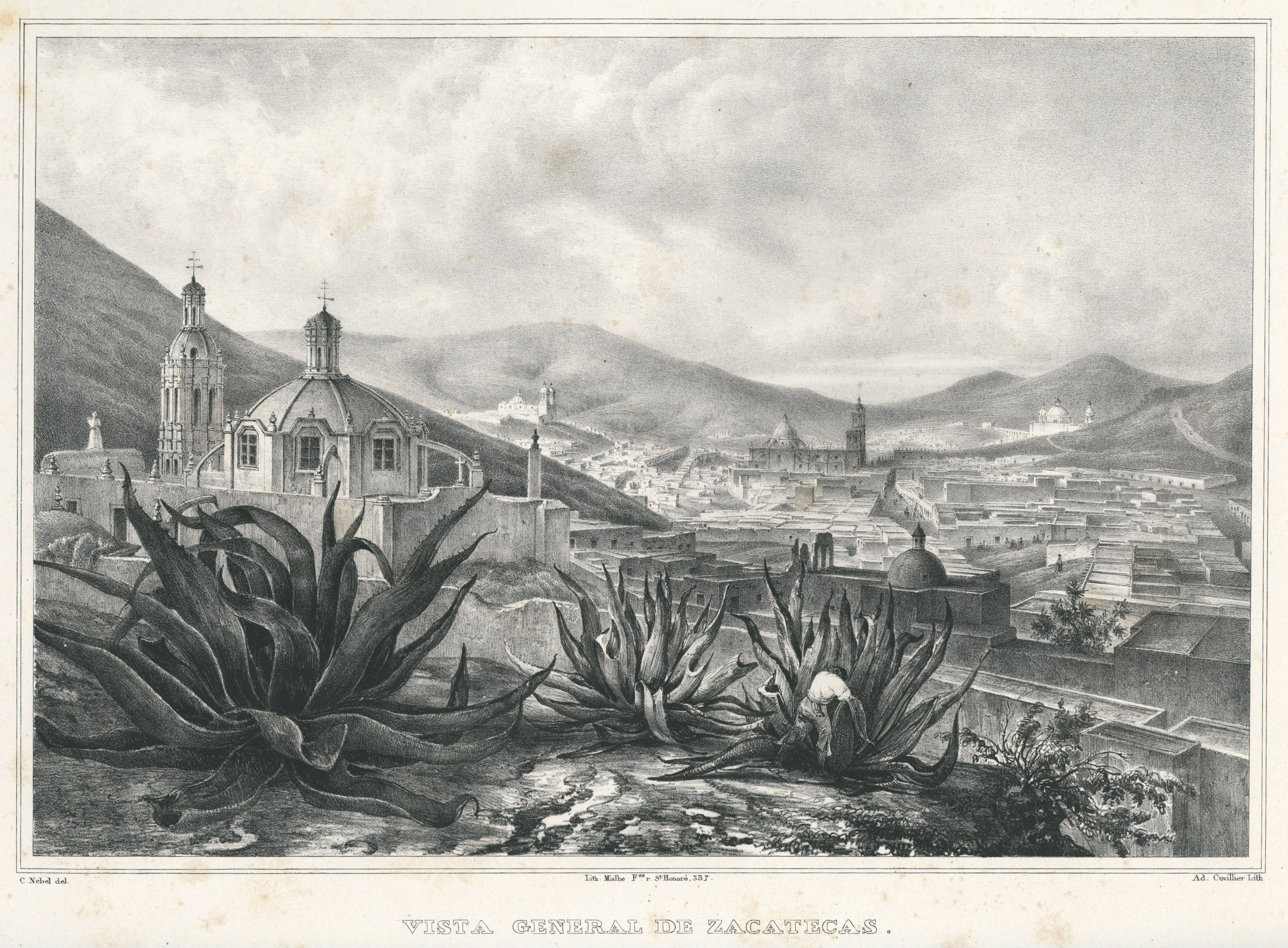
- General View of Zacatecas, 1836
Date	11 May 1835
Location	Near Guadalupe, Zacatecas
Result	Centralist Victory

Belligerents
Centralist Government	Zacatecan rebels

Commanders and leaders
Antonio López de Santa Anna	Francisco García Salinas

Strength
3,400 men	3,000 men

Casualties and losses
100 dead captured or scattered	250 dead, 2,723 captured

The Battle of Zacatecas in 1835 took place on 11 May 1835 in the immediate vicinity of the capital city in the state of Zacatecas, Mexico, between elements of the federal army under the command of Gen. Antonio López de Santa Anna and elements of the rebel army, which was commanded by General Francisco García Salinas during the Rebellion in Zacatecas of 1835.

== Prelude to Battle ==
The Civic Militia of Zacatecas was notably well armed and equipped reporting nearly 20,000 men in its service, though only an estimated 4,000 were actually on active duty and prepared to defend the City.

Santa Anna left Mexico City on April 18th with a division composed of 4,000 men of Infantry, Artillery and Cavalry and headed through Queretaro to Lagos.

Upon learning of Santa Anna's movements, the Active Battalion of Aguascalientes was ordered to reinforce Garcia Salina's force in Zacatecas, this Battalion consisted of 1,300 men but only 300 of them arrived as hundreds had either deserted or defected to join Santa Anna's forces.

== Battle ==
García Salinas marched out with the Civic Militia of Zacatecas to the field of Guadalupe where Santa Anna attacked him at five in the morning on May 11 with a combined force of 3,400 men.

Salinas was warned not to face Santa Anna's forces in an open field by Edward Harkort stating "The battle plan that I had drawn up was rejected by him, and I had to organize and position our forces according to his notions." After the first shots were exchanged, Garcia Salinas fled from the battlefield as well as large groups of Civic Militia soldiers.

Despite this, the battle was fiercely contested for 2 hours. At 9 o'clock, the victory was declared by Santa Anna. According Santa Anna's first report 800 prisoners were taken, the number increased to 2,723 on the 14th. Santa Anna had a loss of 100 men (including the dead, wounded and scattered). In contrast, General Joaquin Parres took Fresnillo and Sombrerete without spilling a single drop of blood.

== Aftermath ==
The entrance of Santa Anna's forces to Zacatecas was followed by disorder and crimes by his troops, mainly against foreigners, whose houses were robbed and some killed.

The Mexican Government paid a small sum of money to recuperate the damages caused to the English citizens.
