= Miguel Barragán =

President of Mexico from 1835 to 1836

The Most Excellent Miguel Barragán
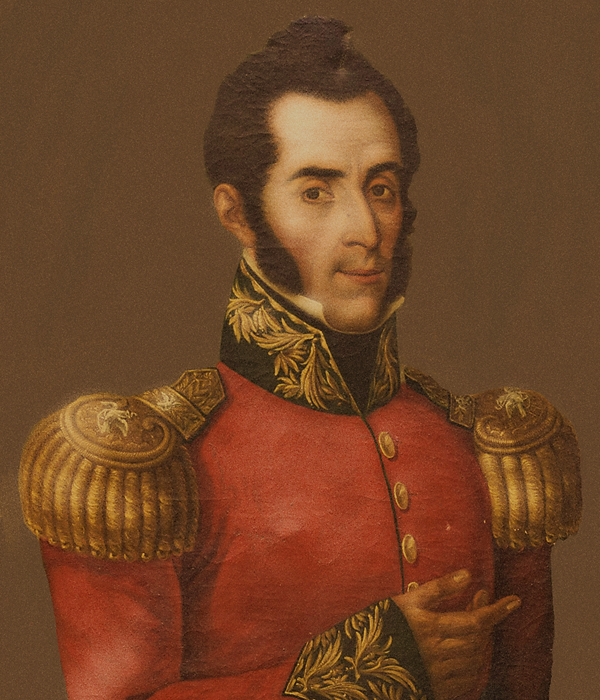

9th President of Mexico
- In office 28 January 1835 – 27 February 1836
- Preceded by: Antonio López de Santa Anna
- Succeeded by: José Justo Corro

Governor of Veracruz
- In office 20 May 1824 – 5 January 1828
- Preceded by: Guadalupe Victoria
- Succeeded by: José María Tornel

Personal details
- Born: 8 March 1789 Ciudad del Maíz, San Luis Potosí, Mexico
- Died: 1 March 1836 (aged 46) Mexico City, Mexico
- Resting place: Mexico City Cathedral
- Party: Conservative
- Spouse: Manuela Trebesto y Casasola
- Occupation: Military officer; politician

Military service
- Allegiance: Kingdom of Spain; Army of the Three Guarantees; Mexico
- Branch/service: Mexican Army
- Years of service: 1810–1835
- Rank: Brigadier General
- Battles/wars: Mexican War of Independence; Spanish attempts to reconquer Mexico; Capitulation of San Juan de Ulúa

Miguel Francisco Barragán Andrade (8 March 1789 – 1 March 1836) was a Mexican soldier and politician who served as interim president of Mexico from 1835 to 1836. He had previously served as Governor of Veracruz, and gained national fame for the capture of the Fortress of San Juan de Ulúa in 1824, through which Spanish military presence was finally expelled from Mexico.

He initially was a supporter of the federalist Constitution of 1824, but became a partisan of the conservative Escoses Party, who strongly critiqued the Constitution, and would eventually transform the First Mexican Republic into the Centralist Republic of Mexico, a transition in which Barragán played a military role. During the Centralist Republic, he was nominated by Antonio López de Santa Anna to hold presidential office while Santa Anna went off to fight insurrections against the new constitution, including the Texas Revolution, but Barragán's poor health led him to die in office. He was succeeded by his Minister of Justice, José Justo Corro.

== Early life ==
Miguel Barragán was born in 1789, in the Valle del Maíz, San Luis Potosí. He attended school in the provincial capital and entered the military, and was as member of the Trigarantine Army upholding Agustín de Iturbide's Plan of Iguala. His opposition to the First Mexican Empire landed him in prison, but he was released when the Empire fell in 1823.

== Governor of Veracruz ==
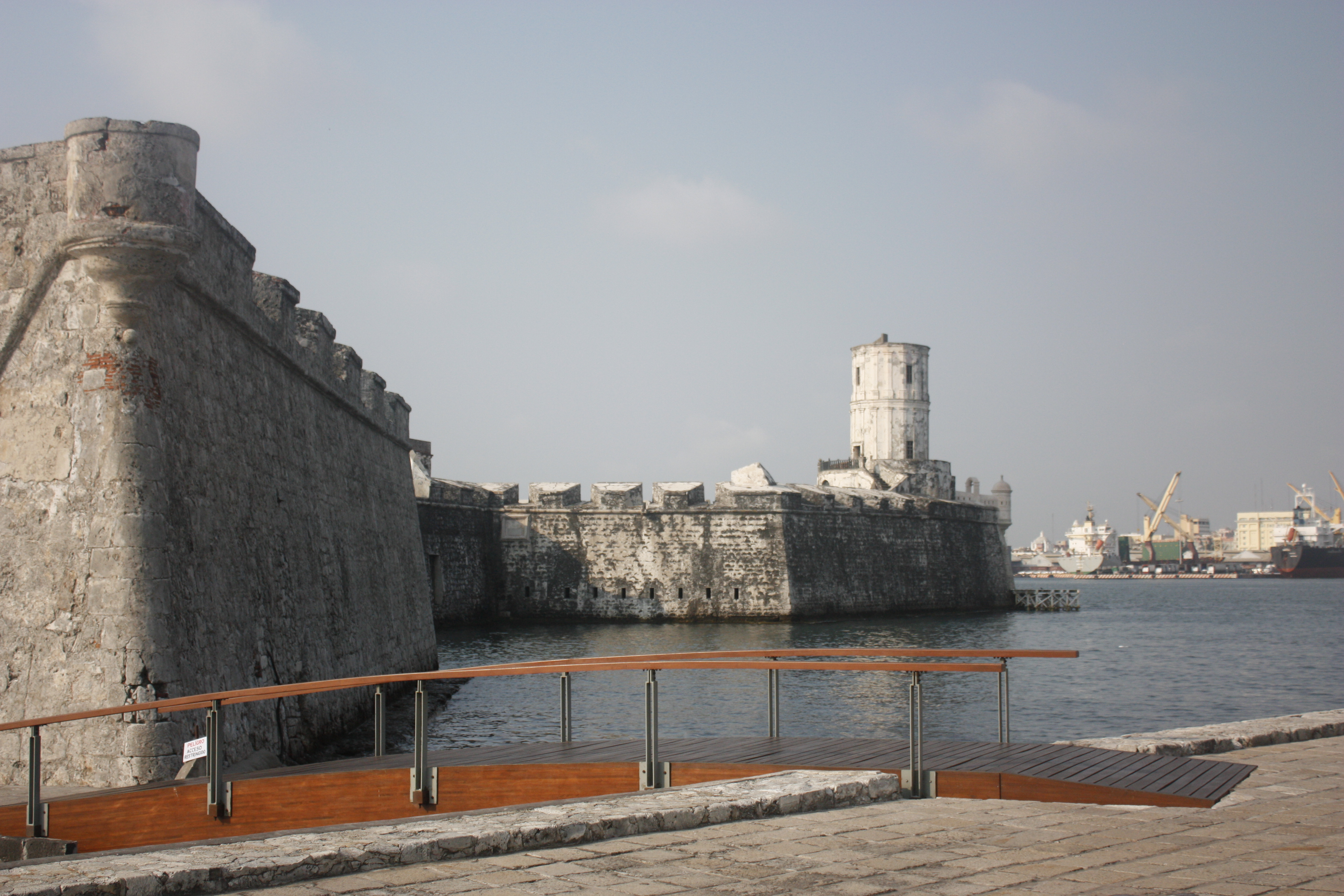
A portion of the Fortress of San Juan de Ulua

The Provisional Government of Mexico named him commandant-general of Veracruz in June 1824, and in September he was elected by the Congress of Veracruz to be governor of the province. One of his first issues as governor was to deal with the remaining Spaniards in the Fortress of San Juan de Ulúa and he succeeded in blockading it.

He was a staunch supporter of the constitution, and when the State of Veracruz asked its civil servants to swear an oath to the new Constitution of 1824, he addressed the public assuring them that their rights and prosperity were now secured in the code they were about to swear an oath to, calling it ‘the dignified result of the patriotic efforts of our founding fathers.’

During his governorship, he passed notable regulations regarding the police, and he attended to his duties without losing focus on the ongoing situation with San Juan de Ulúa. His presence served to contain a revolution that broke out at Sacrificios. He received the American Minister Joel Roberts Poinsett, directing his authorities to attend to all his needs. He also received the minister of the Netherlands, Quartel, providing him funds to pay for his board.

Meanwhile, Barragán had established communications with the Spanish commander at San Juan de Ulúa, Brigadier Coppinger, through an English intermediary, and on 5 November 1824, the Spanish finally agreed to surrender the Fortress of San Juan de Ulúa. Mexican officials were sent to the fort to further negotiate, and the capitulation was ratified on 18 November. On 23 November, the Mexican flag was raised over the fort.

Barragán was awarded by the legislature of Veracruz with a ceremonial sword, and his troops. His name and that of the commanders who had played a key role in the capture of San Juan de Ulúa were inscribed in gold in the hall of sessions, and the term ‘heroic’ was added to the state of Veracruz. Barragán was received with celebrations in Jalapa, and the ayuntamiento of that town placed his portrait in the main hall, considering him to be the man who had finally completed Mexican independence.

After the capture of San Juan de Ulúa, Barragán returned to his administrative duties as governor. He asked the Ayuntamientos for information about idle lands, with the object of setting them aside for colonization, and he published the British recognition of Mexican independence. He ordered the municipal administration to record all taxes that came from public lands and from bonds be recorded in one file for the sake of accountability.

== Role in Revolts ==
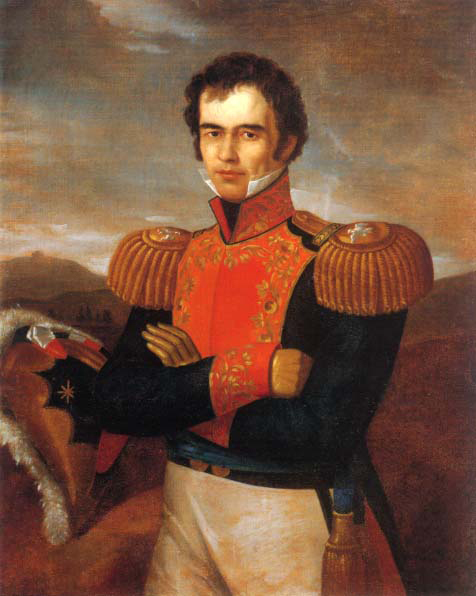
Barragan became an opponent of Guadalupe Victoria the first president of Mexico.

Barragán would now be caught up in the fierce partisan conflicts between the Yorkino Party and the Escoses Party. President Guadalupe Victoria was a member of the Yorkino Party while Barragán belonged to the Escoses Party. The former notably advocated an expulsion of the remaining Spaniards from the country. When the federal government sent Ignacio Esteva as state commissioner, Barragán expelled him from the state, which was legally an act of sedition. Barragán was implicated in an Escoses pronunciamiento, asking for the abolition of secret societies and the expulsion of Poinsett. Colonel José Rincón rose up in Veracruz against governor Barragán. The federal government sent General Guerrero to Jalapa, where Barragán resided and succeeded in negotiating an agreement. Estava was placed as commissioner, and Barragán remained in the governorship, with Ignacio Mora in command of the military.

He participated in the Plan de Montaño, led by Vice President Nicolás Bravo. The insurrection failed, and Barragán was ironically imprisoned at San Juan de Ulúa, which he had captured shortly before, and then transported to the capital to be tried. He was tried together with Bravo, and their previous services to the nation contributed to the clemency that was shown by the court. In the end they were simply condemned to be banished, Barragán for six years. He was able to return to the country in 1829, due to an amnesty passed by President Vicente Guerrero.

== Presidency ==

Government of Miguel Barragán
Office	Name	Term
Relations	José María Gutiérrez de Estrada	27 Feb 1836 – 19 Apr 1837
Jose Maria Ortiz Monasterio	27 Feb 1836 – 19 Apr 1837
Manuel Díez de Bonilla	27 Feb 1836 – 19 Apr 1837
Jose Maria Ortiz Monasterio	27 Feb 1836 – 19 Apr 1837
Justice	Agustin Torres	27 Feb 1836 – 19 Apr 1837
Jose Mariano Blasco	27 Feb 1836 – 19 Apr 1837
José Justo Corro	27 Feb 1836 – 19 Apr 1837
Treasury	Jose Mariano Blasco	28 Jan 1835- 28 Aug 1835
Manuel Díez de Bonilla	29 Aug 1835 – 16 Sep 1835
Vicente Segura	17 Sep 1835 – 30 Sep 1835
Juan Jose del Corral	1 Oct 1835 – 12 Oct 1835
Antonio Vallejo	13 Oct 1835 – 2 Feb 1836
Rafael Mangino y Mendívil	3 Feb 1836 – 27 Feb 1836
War	José María Tornel	28 Jan 1835 – 27 Feb 1836

During the presidency of Anastasio Bustamante, Barragán was living in San Pedro, near Guadalajara. He was a critic of the Bustamante government and proposed a junta of eighteen notable citizens who could reform the country, leading to Barragán being attacked in the official newspaper.

He was named minister of war under the liberal administration of Valentín Gómez Farías, but he joined Santa Anna when the latter turned on Gómez Farías and overthrew him in April 1834. The State of Jalisco opposed the overthrow of the government and Barragán was sent to gain their adherence along with General Quintanar. It was at this point, in January 1835, that Congress named Barragán as interim President in 1835.

President Barragán had to deal with an insurrection in May 1835, led by Juan Álvarez in Texca, urging a return to the federal system. Petitions however came in from Orizaba, Toluca, and Jalapa urging rather to move away from the federal system and towards a centralized, unitary system of government. Another federalist insurrection in Zacatecas was pacified, and on 23 October 1835, the congress declared itself to be a constitutional congress. A new constitution was drafted by Francisco Manuel Sánchez de Tagle and Lucas Alamán and was published throughout the nation at the end of the year.

Barragán sought to raise funds for the war effort against rebellious Texas, towards which Santa Anna was headed, and he also had to deal with insurrections fighting for the reestablishment of the federal system, led by Jose Antonio Mejia. Another federalist insurrection broke out in Tampico in December 1835, but a majority of the garrison remained loyal and commander Gomez was able to reestablish order. The following day three vessels bearing mercenaries that set out from New Orleans overpowered the fort of La Barra through the betrayal of Commander Ortega, but they were defeated.

Barragán passed fierce measures to persecute army deserters and commanded that foreigners and arms being sent to aid the Texans, not be allowed to pass through any of the coastal states. His health, however began to swiftly decline. On his death bed, he was surrounded by friends, servants, and clergy. He died on 1 March 1836, shortly after kissing an icon of Christ, and was buried in the National Cathedral.

== See also ==
- List of heads of state of Mexico
