= Antonio López de Santa Anna =

President of Mexico many times, 1833 to 1855

His Most Serene Highness Antonio López de Santa Anna
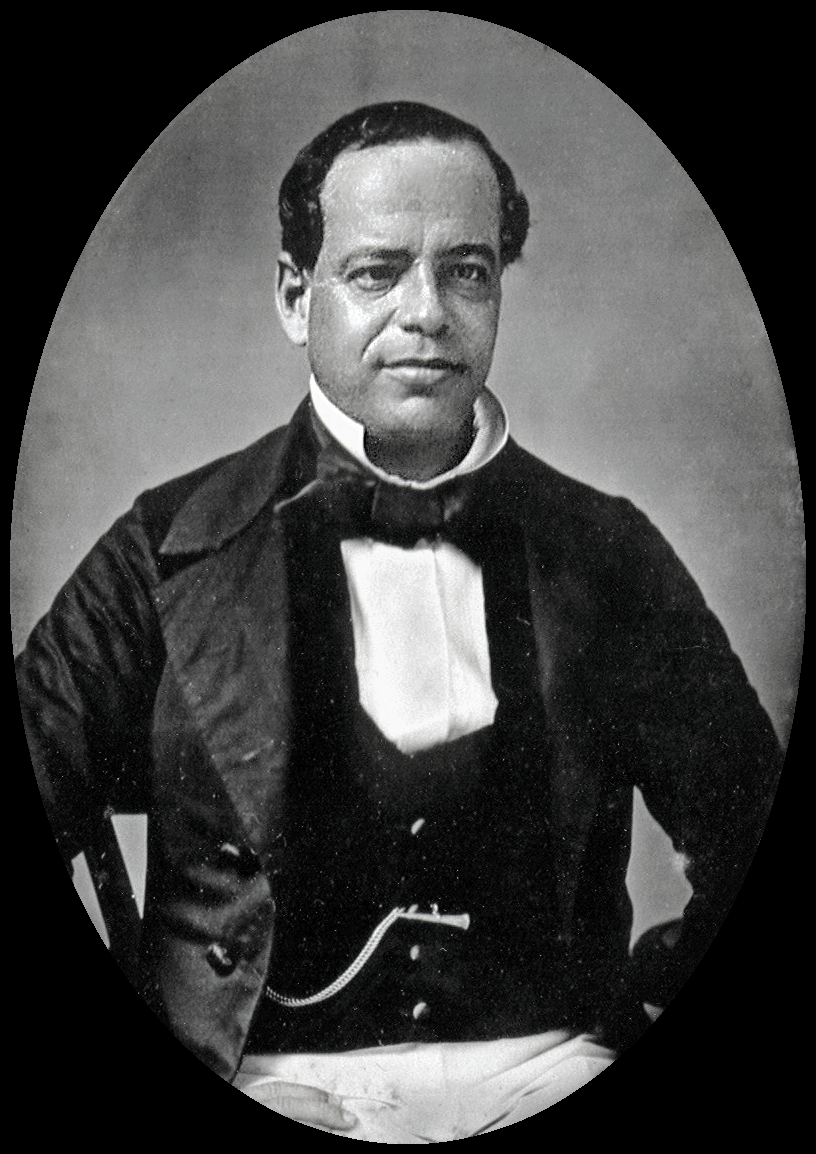
- Daguerreotype of Santa Anna, c. 1853

8th President of Mexico
- President of the United Mexican States
- In office 20 April 1853 – 12 August 1855
- Preceded by: Manuel María Lombardini
- Succeeded by: Martín Carrera
- In office 20 May – 15 September 1847
- Preceded by: Pedro María de Anaya
- Succeeded by: Manuel de la Peña y Peña
- In office 21 March – 2 April 1847
- Preceded by: Valentín Gómez Farías
- Succeeded by: Pedro María de Anaya
- President of the Mexican Republic
- In office 4 June – 12 September 1844
- Preceded by: Valentín Canalizo
- Succeeded by: José Joaquín de Herrera
- In office 14 May – 6 September 1843
- Preceded by: Nicolás Bravo
- Succeeded by: Valentín Canalizo
- In office 10 October 1841 – 26 October 1842
- Preceded by: Francisco Javier Echeverría
- Succeeded by: Nicolás Bravo
- In office 20 March – 10 July 1839
- Preceded by: Anastasio Bustamante
- Succeeded by: Nicolás Bravo
- President of the United Mexican States
- In office 24 April 1834 – 27 January 1835
- Vice President: Valentín Gómez Farías
- Preceded by: Valentín Gómez Farías
- Succeeded by: Miguel Barragán
- In office 27 October – 15 December 1833
- Vice President: Valentín Gómez Farías
- Preceded by: Valentín Gómez Farías
- Succeeded by: Valentín Gómez Farías
- In office 18 June – 5 July 1833
- Vice President: Valentín Gómez Farías
- Preceded by: Valentin Gómez Farías
- Succeeded by: Valentín Gómez Farías
- In office 17 May – 3 June 1833
- Vice President: Valentín Gómez Farías
- Preceded by: Valentín Gómez Farías
- Succeeded by: Valentín Gómez Farías
Other offices
Governor of Veracruz
In office 5 November 1829 – 2 January 1830
Preceded by	Sebastián Camacho
Succeeded by	Sebastián Camacho
In office 7 February 1829 – 26 May 1829
Preceded by	Sebastián Camacho
Succeeded by	Sebastián Camacho
Governor of Yucatán
In office 6 July 1824 – 25 April 1825
Preceded by	Francisco Antonio Tarraz
Succeeded by	José Tiburcio López Constante

Personal details
- Born: 21 February 1794 Xalapa, Veracruz, Viceroyalty of New Spain (present-day Mexico)
- Died: 21 June 1876 (aged 82) Mexico City, Mexican Republic
- Resting place: Panteón del Tepeyac, Mexico City
- Party: Liberal; Conservative
- Spouses: María Inés de la Paz García (m. 1825; died 1844) María de los Dolores de Tosta (m. 1844)
- Awards: Order of Charles III; Order of Guadalupe
- Nickname: The Napoleon of the West

Military service
- Allegiance: Kingdom of Spain; Army of the Three Guarantees; Mexico
- Years of service: 1810–1855
- Rank: General
- Battles/wars: Mexican War of Independence; Battle of Medina; Casa Mata Plan Revolution; Spanish attempts to reconquer Mexico; Battle of Tampico; Zacatecas rebellion of 1835; Battle of Zacatecas; Texas Revolution; Battle of the Alamo; Battle of San Jacinto; Pastry War; Battle of Veracruz; Mexican–American War; Battle of Buena Vista; Battle of Cerro Gordo; Battle of Chapultepec; Battle of Huamantla

Antonio de Padua María Severino López de Santa Anna y Pérez de Lebrón (21 February 1794 – 21 June 1876), often known as Santa Anna, was a Mexican general, politician, and caudillo who served as the eighth president of Mexico on multiple occasions between 1833 and 1855. A controversial and pivotal figure in Mexican politics during the 19th century, he has been called an "uncrowned monarch" by some historians who refer to the 30 years after Mexico's independence as the "Age of Santa Anna." Santa Anna is often remembered in Mexico as a vendepatria due to the loss of Mexican territory to the United States during his rule.

During the Mexican War of Independence (1810-1821), Santa Anna fought as a royalist officer for over a decade before switching sides to join the insurgency in 1821. He then led a garrison in Veracruz until the final insurgent victory on September 27, 1821. He played a major role in the rise and fall of both the First Mexican Empire and the First Mexican Republic. His long career spanned the Texas Revolution, Pastry War, and the Mexican–American War, as well as the creation of the Centralist Republic of Mexico through the Siete Leyes in 1835 and later, the Bases Orgánicas, which came into effect in 1843.

Throughout his career, Santa Anna frequently switched sides, a pattern that began in the War of Independence and continuously in political conflicts between liberal and conservative factions within Mexico's government. He was instrumental in discarding the liberal Constitution of 1824 in 1835, and in restoring it in 1847. Santa Anna was elected President as a liberal in 1833 and again in 1847, sharing power with the liberal Vice President, Valentín Gómez Farías. In both instances, once in power, Santa Anna switched sides in favor of conservatives and overthrew Farías. Santa Anna was known for his ostentatious and dictatorial style of rule and use of the military to dissolve Mexico's Congress on several occasions. Later in his career, he referred to himself by the honorific title, His Most Serene Highness.

Santa Anna's intermittent periods of rule lasted from 1832 to 1855 in which Mexico experienced the loss of Texas, a series of military conflicts during the Mexican–American War, and the Mexican Cession. Santa Anna's leadership during the Mexican-American war and his willingness to fight to the bitter end, prolonged the conflict with historians noting that "more than any other single person it was Santa Anna who denied Polk's dream of a short war." Six years after the war ended, Santa Anna ceded Mexican territory to the United States through the Gadsden Purchase in 1854. In 1855 while serving as President of Mexico, Santa Anna, removed from office by the Plan of Ayutla, went into exile. In 1874, an elderly Santa Anna was allowed to return to Mexico by then President Sebastián Lerdo de Tejada. In 1876, Santa Anna died in Mexico City.

== Early life ==
Antonio de Padua María Severino López de Santa Anna y Pérez de Lebrón was born in Xalapa, Veracruz, Nueva España (New Spain), on 21 February 1794 into a respected Spanish criollo family. He was named after his father, licenciado Antonio López de Santa Anna y Pérez (born 1761), a university graduate and a lawyer; his mother was Manuela Pérez de Lebrón y Cortés (died 1814).

Santa Anna's family prospered in Veracruz, where the merchant class dominated politics. His paternal uncle, Ángel López de Santa Anna, was a public clerk (escribano) and became aggrieved when the town council of Veracruz prevented him from moving to Mexico City to advance his career. Since the late 18th-century Bourbon Reforms, the Spanish crown had favored Peninsulares over American-born; young Santa Anna's family was affected by the growing disgruntlement of criollos whose upward mobility was thwarted.

Santa Anna's mother favored her son's choice of a military career, supporting his desire to join the Spanish Army, rather than be a shopkeeper as his father preferred. His mother's friendly relationship with the intendant (governor) of Veracruz secured Santa Anna's military appointment on July 6, 1810, despite the fact that he was underage. His parents' marriage produced seven children, four sisters and two brothers, and Santa Anna was close to his sister Francisca and brother Manuel, who also joined the army.

== Military and political career ==
Santa Anna's origins on Mexico's eastern coast had important ramifications for his military career, as he had developed immunity from yellow fever, endemic to the region. The port of Veracruz and environs were known to be unhealthy for those not native to the region, so he had a personal strategic advantage against military officers from elsewhere. Being an officer in a time of war was a way that a provincial, middle-class man could vault from obscurity to a position of leadership. Santa Anna distinguished himself in battle, a path that led him to a national political career.

Santa Anna's provincial origins made him uncomfortable in the halls of power in Mexico City, which were dominated by cliques of elite men, and thus he frequently made retreats to his base in Veracruz. He cultivated contact with ordinary Mexican men and pursued entertainments such as cockfighting. Over his career, Santa Anna was a populist caudillo, a strongman wielding both military and political power, similar to others who emerged in the wake of Spanish American wars of independence.

=== War of Independence, 1810–1821 ===
Santa Anna's early military career during the Mexican War of Independence, which entailed fighting the insurgency before switching sides against the crown, presaged his many shifts in allegiance during his later political career.

In June 1810, the 16-year-old Santa Anna joined the Fijo de Veracruz infantry regiment under the command of José Joaquín de Arredondo. In September of that year, secular cleric Miguel Hidalgo y Costilla sparked a spontaneous mass uprising in the Bajío, Mexico's rich agricultural area. Although some criollo elites had chafed as their upward mobility had been thwarted by the Bourbon Reforms, the Hidalgo Revolt saw most criollos favoring continued crown rule. In particular, Santa Anna's family "saw themselves as aligned to the peninsular elite, whom they served, and were in turn, recognized as "belonging".

Initially, Santa Anna, like most criollo military officers, fought for the Spanish crown against the mixed-raced insurgents for independence; his commanding officer was Colonel José Joaquín de Arredondo. In 1811 he was wounded in the left hand by an arrow while fighting in the town of Amoladeras, in the intendancy (administrative district) of San Luis Potosí. In 1813 he served in Texas against the Gutiérrez–Magee Expedition and at the Battle of Medina, in which he was cited for bravery. Santa Anna was promoted quickly; he became a second lieutenant in February 1812 and first lieutenant before the end of that year. During the initial rebellion, the young officer witnessed Arredondo's fierce counterinsurgency policy of mass executions. The early fighting against the rebels gave way to guerrilla warfare and a military stalemate.In 1814, Santa Anna was promoted as aide to General Dávila, royalist commander of Veracruz and in March 1816, he was promoted to the rank of captain and commanded troops sent to rescue Orizaba and Cordoba held by pro-independence forces. On March 23, 1821 he arrived in Orizaba and successfully defeated the insurgents. As a reward, Santa Anna was promoted to a lieutenant colonel by a Viceroy who was accompanied by General Herrara. Santa Anna later came to the aid of Herrera in Tepeaca, winning another battle and was promoted to Chief of the Army's 11th Division by royalist officer, Agustín de Iturbide.

When Iturbide switched sides in 1821 and allied with insurgent Vicente Guerrero, fighting for independence under the Plan of Iguala, Santa Anna, after a decade of fighting for the Spanish Crown, also joined the fight for independence. Political developments in Spain, where liberals had ousted King Ferdinand VII and began implementing the Spanish liberal constitution of 1812, made many elites in Mexico reconsider their options. Headed by Iturbide and a 33 member board, the Declaration of Independence of the Mexican Empire was ratified on September 28, 1821.

=== Rebellion against the Mexican Empire of Iturbide, 1822–1823 ===
Iturbide, now Emperor Augustin I, of the newly formed Mexican Empire, rewarded Santa Anna with the command of the vital port of Veracruz, the gateway from the Gulf of Mexico to the rest of the nation and site of a customs house. However, Iturbide subsequently removed Santa Anna from the post, prompting Santa Anna to rise in rebellion with Guadalupe Victoria and Guerrero in December 1822 against Iturbide.

Santa Anna already had significant power in his home region of Veracruz, and "he was well along the path to becoming the regional caudillo." He claimed in his Plan of Veracruz that he rebelled because Iturbide had dissolved the Constituent Congress in October. Santa Anna also promised to support free trade with Spain, an important principle for his home region of Veracruz.

Although Santa Anna's initial rebellion was important, Iturbide had loyal military men who were able to hold their own against the rebels in Veracruz. However, former insurgent leaders Guerrero and Nicolás Bravo, who had supported Iturbide's Plan de Iguala, returned to their base in southern Mexico and raised a rebellion against Iturbide. The commander of imperial forces in Veracruz, who had fought against the rebels, changed sides and joined the rebels. On February 1, 1823, the new coalition proclaimed the Plan of Casa Mata, which called for the end of the monarchy, restoration of the Constituent Congress, and creation of a republic and a federal system.

With his forces defecting to the rebels, Iturbide decided to abdicate on 19 March 1823. No longer the main player in the movement against Iturbide or the creation of new political arrangements, Santa Anna sought to regain his position as a leader and marched forces to Tampico, then to San Luis Potosí, proclaiming in support of a federal republic and his role as the "protector of the federation".

Representatives from San Luis Potosí and other north-central regions, such as Michoacán, Querétaro, and Guanajuato, met to decide their own position towards the federation. Santa Anna pledged his military forces to the protection of these key areas. "He attempted, in other words, to co-opt the movement, the first of many examples in his long career where he placed himself as the head of a generalized movement so it would become an instrument of his advancement."

=== Santa Anna and the early Mexican Republic, 1824–1826 ===
Following Iturbide's abdication as emperor, Santa Anna had been placed on house arrest however in June, Guerrero intervened and had Santa Anna released. Guerrero also had him reinstated as a brigadier general and named the military commander of Yucatán.

At the time, Yucatán's capital of Mérida and the port city of Campeche were in conflict. Yucatán's closest trade partner was Cuba, a Spanish colony. Santa Anna took it upon himself without approval from the Mexican Government to declare war against Spain and plan a landing force from Yucatán in Cuba, which he envisioned would result in Cuban colonists welcoming their "liberators", most especially himself. One thousand Mexicans were already on ships to sail to Cuba when word came that the Spanish were reinforcing their colony, so the invasion was called off.

In 1824, former insurgent general Guadalupe Victoria, a liberal federalist, became the first president of the Mexican republic following the creation of the constitution of 1824. His Vice President was Nicolás Bravo, a conservative. Victoria came to the presidency with little factional conflict, and served out his entire four-year term. On April 25, 1825, President Victoria named Santa Anna the director of the Corp of Engineers. Santa Anna served for a limited time but walked away from the position, choosing to go back to Veracruz where he married the wealthy 14 year old, Maria Ines de la Paz Garcia. Using her dowry, Santa Anna purchased the hacienda, Manga de Clavo where he briefly retired until 1827 when he was appointed the Vice Governor of Veracruz.

=== Governorship, suppressed coup, and the 1828 presidential election, 1827–1828 ===
Unlike Victoria election, the election of 1828 was highly partisan, full of considerable political conflict in which Santa Anna became involved. Even before the election, there was unrest in Mexico, with some conservatives affiliated with the Scottish Rite Freemasons plotting rebellion. In December 1827, the Montaño Rebellion (Plan de Montaño) a secret attempt at a coup d'e'tat by Vice President Bravo, called for the prohibition of secret societies, implicitly meaning liberal York Rite Freemasons, and the expulsion of U.S. diplomat Joel Roberts Poinsett, a promoter of federal republicanism. Santa Anna, a member of the Scottish Rite, was expected to be a supporter of the Scottish Rite conservatives, however in he eventually allied with Guerrero in support to the liberals and suppressed the uprising. In his home state of Veracruz, Governor Miguel Barragán had supported the rebels and was exiled after the rebellion's failure. Santa Anna as Vice Governor stepped into the governorship in January 1828.

In the 1828 election, Santa Anna supported Guerrero's candidacy for the presidency. Lorenzo de Zavala, an important liberal also supported Guerrero. However, conservative Manuel Gómez Pedraza won the indirect elections for the presidency, with Guerrero coming in second and Anastasio Bustamante, in third. On September 1, 1828, Congress declared Pedraza the president - elect with Guerrero, as the vice president-elect.

On September 12, 1828, Santa Anna demanded that Guerrero, not Pedraza be President. He resigned from his governorship and raised a rebellion, leading 800 loyal troops to capture a fortress in Perote. Santa Anna called for the nullification of the election results, as well for a new law expelling Spanish nationals who he believed to have been in league with the conservatives. Southern Mexican leader Juan Álvarez soon joined Santa Anna, while Zavala, under threat of arrest by the conservative Senate, fled to the mountains to organized his own rebellion. Zavala brought the fighting into Mexico City, with his supporters seizing an armory, the Acordada.

On December 8, 1828, the President-elect Gómez Pedraza resigned and went into exile. Victoria, as the sitting president named Guerrero the Secretary of War and Marine on the same day. This move was intended to calm the rebellious liberal factions and stabilize the military. Santa Anna gained prominence for his role in Gómez Pedraza's ouster and was lauded as a defender of federalism and democracy.

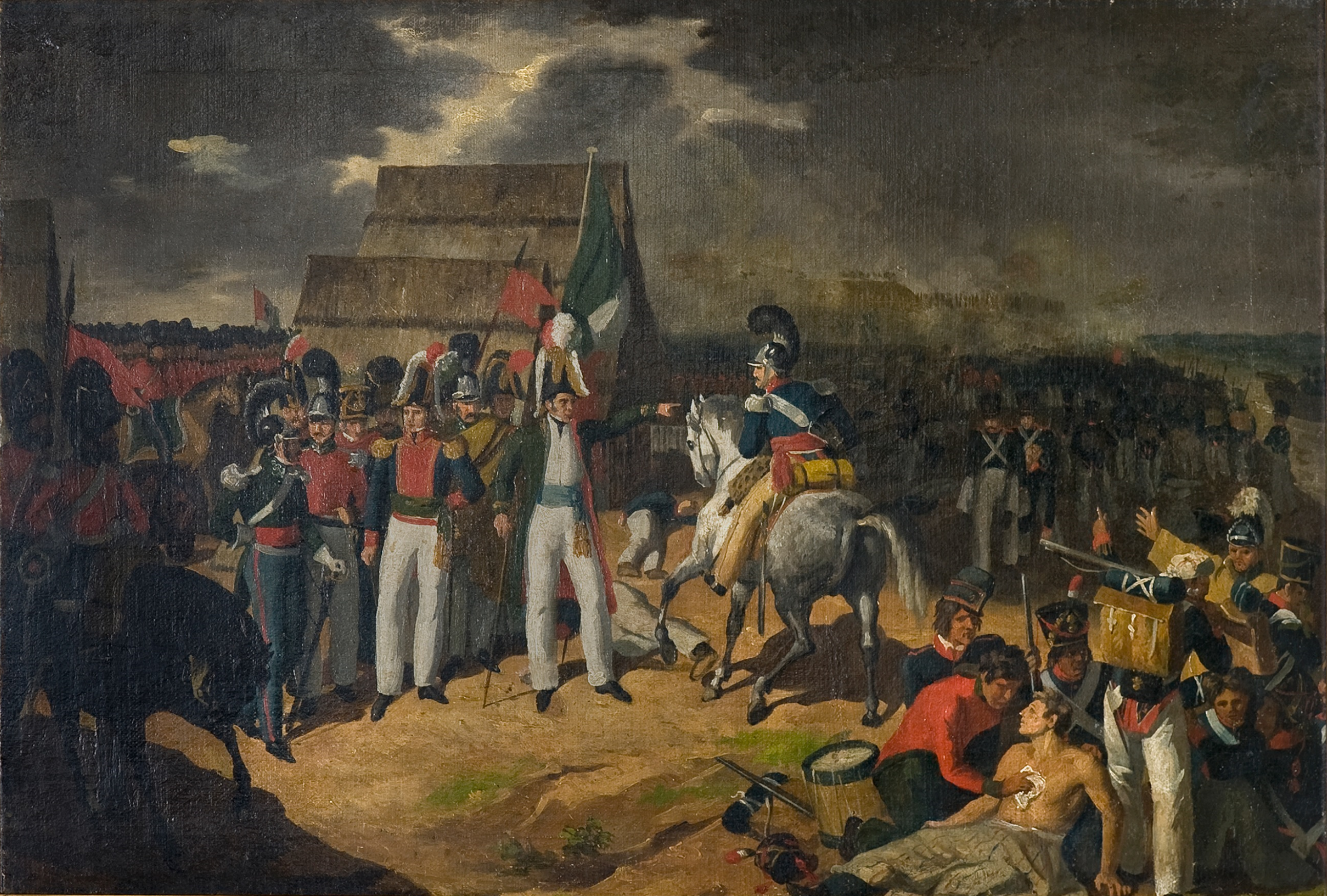
1835 painting of the Battle of Tampico

=== Victor of Tampico and the Spanish invasion, 1829–1832 ===
On April 1, 1829, Guerrero assumed the presidency with Bustamante as Vice President and Santa Anna stepped back into office as the Governor of Veracruz.

Upon receiving news that Spain was mounting yet another invasion to retake Mexico, President Guerrero invoked emergency executive powers to fund the defense and officially dispatched Santa Anna to lead the counter-offensive, then sent Vice President Bustamante to Jalapa with a reserve army to protect the coast against any secondary assault planned by the Spanish.

Santa Anna seized civilian vessels to transport his forces down the coast. On July 27, 1829, the campaign culminated in the Battle of Tampico, where the Spanish deployed 2600 troops. Santa Anna launched a night assault on Fort La Barra to cut off the Spanish supply lines. With many of his soldiers severely weakened by yellow fever and starvation, General Isidro Barradas officially surrendered to Santa Anna, on September 11, 1829, marking the final attempt to retake Mexico by Spain. Barradas signed the Capitulation of Pueblo Viejo in the presence of Santa Anna, General Manuel de Mier y Terán and Felipe de la Garza.

The defeat of the Spanish Army not only firmly established Santa Anna as a national hero but also consolidated the independence of the new Mexican republic. From this point forward, Santa Anna styled himself the "Victor of Tampico" and the "Savior of the Patria". His main act of self-promotion was to call himself the "Napoleon of the West". Santa Anna returned to Veracruz on October 4, 1829.

On December 4, 1829, the Plan of Jalapa led by Vice-president Bustamante sought to overthrow President Guerrero, citing that his retention of emergency executive powers two months after achieving victory over Spain was a violation of the 1824 Constitution. The plan designated Bustamante and Santa Anna to act as the plan's executors. Santa Anna declined but offered to act as mediator between the parties. President Guerrero rejected the offer and left Mexico City to build a counter-rebellion in the south. Bustamante assumed presidential powers on January 1, 1830. Guerrero was captured on January 20, 1831 and was executed after a summary trial on February 14, 1831. In 1832, Santa Anna seized the customs revenues from Veracruz and declared himself in rebellion against President Bustamante. The bloody conflict ended with Santa Anna forcing the resignation of Bustamante's cabinet. An agreement was brokered for new elections in 1833.

=== The "Absentee President", 1833–1835 ===
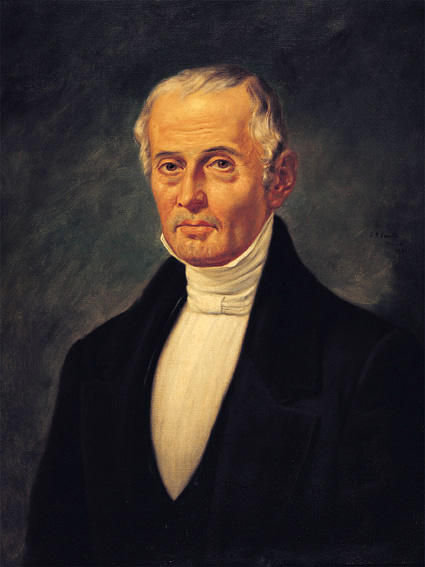
Dr. Valentín Gómez Farías, Santa Anna's vice president 1833–34, who enacted liberal reforms

Santa Anna was elected president on 1 April 1833. Vice-president Valentín Gómez Farías immediately took over the responsibility of governing the nation while Santa Anna retired to Manga de Clavo in Veracruz. In his memoirs, Santa Anna wrote “I preferred the hazards of war to the seductive and sought after life of the palace.” According to Mexican historian Enrique Krauze, "It annoyed him and bored him, and perhaps frightened him." A biographer of Santa Anna describes his role during this period as the "absentee president".

Upon taking office, the new Administration inherited a severe financial crisis. Mexico was saddled with an empty treasury and an 11 million peso debt incurred by the Bustamante government. Vice President Farías could not cut back on the bloated expenditures on the army without risking an immediate military revolt and was forced to seek alternative revenues. Anti-clericalism was a core tenet of Mexican liberalism, and the Roman Catholic Church had heavily supported previous Bustamante's government, so targeting the church was a logical move for the administration. The administration enacted a series of radical legislative reforms:

1. Abolishment of Tithe: Tithing, a mandatory 10% tax on agricultural production, was abolished as a legal obligation.
2. Seizing Assets: The state seized church property, redirected ecclesiastical finances, and claimed the right to make church appointments.
3. Secularizing Education: The church's monopoly on education was dismantled and the Royal and Pontifical University of Mexico closed.

These measures caused immense concern among Mexican conservatives and the clergy. Gómez Farías sought to extend these reforms to the frontier province of Alta California, promoting legislation to secularize the Franciscan missions there. He organized the Híjar-Padrés colony to bolster non-mission civilian colony, as well as defend the province against perceived Russian colonial ambitions from the trading post at Fort Ross. However, for liberal intellectual and Catholic priest José María Luis Mora, selling church property was the key to "transforming Mexico into a liberal, progressive nation of small landowners." Sale of nonessential church property would bring in much-needed revenue to the treasury. The army was also targeted for reform, since it was the largest single expenditure in the national budget. On Santa Anna's suggestion, the number of battalions was to be reduced as well as the number of generals and brigadiers.

In June 1833, Congress passed the Ley del Caso (Case Law) which called for the arrest of 51 politicians, including Bustamante, for holding "unpatriotic" beliefs and their expulsion from the country. Gómez Farías claimed that Santa Anna was the driving force for the law, which evidence seems to support. With increasing resistance from the church as well as the army, the Plan of Cuernavaca was issued in 1834, likely orchestrated by former general and governor of the Federal District, José María Tornel. The plan called for repeal of the Ley del Caso; discouraged tolerance of the influence of Masonic lodges, where politics was pursued in secrecy; declared void the laws passed by Congress and the local legislatures in favor of the reforms; requested the protection of Santa Anna to fulfill the plan and recognize him as the only authority; removed from office deputies and officials who carried out enforcement of the reform laws and decrees; and provided military force to support Gómez Farías in implementing the plan.

As public and military opinion turned aggressively against the reforms, Santa Anna withdrew his support from his own administration and returned to the presidency, causing Gómez Farías resigned and go into exile. This set the stage for conservatives to reshape Mexico's government from a federalist republic to a unitary central republic.

=== Central Republic, 1835 ===
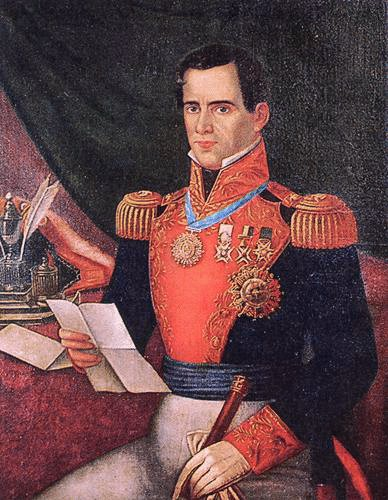
Santa Anna in a Mexican military uniform

For conservatives, the liberal reform of Gómez Farías was radical and threatened the power of the elites. Santa Anna's actions in allowing this first reform (followed by a more sweeping one in 1855) might have been a test case for liberalism. At this point, Santa Anna was a liberal; by giving the moderate Gómez Farías responsibility for the reforms, he could have plausible deniability and closely monitor the reaction to a comprehensive attack on the special privileges of the army and the church, as well as confiscation of church wealth, enacted by Congress.

In May 1834, Santa Anna ordered the disarmament of the civic militia and urged Congress to abolish the controversial Ley del Caso. On 12 June he dissolved Congress and announced his decision to adopt the Plan of Cuernavaca, forming a new Catholic, centralist and conservative government. Santa Anna brokered a deal where, in exchange for preserving the privileges of the church and the army, the church promised a monthly donation to the government of 30,000–40,000 pesos. "The santanistas [supporters of Santa Anna] succeeded in achieving what the radicals had failed to do: forcing the Church to assist the republic's daily fiscal needs with its funds and properties."

On 4 January 1835, Santa Anna returned to his hacienda, placing Miguel Barragán as acting president. He soon replaced the 1824 constitution with the new document known as the "Siete Leyes" ("The Seven Laws"). Santa Anna did not involve himself with the conservative effort to replace the federalist constitution with a unitary central government, seemingly uneasy with their political path. "Although he has been blamed for the change to centralism, he was not actually present during any of the deliberations that led to the abolition of the federalist charter or the elaboration of the 1836 Constitution."

Several states openly rebelled against the changes, including Alta California, Nuevo México, Tabasco, Sonora, Coahuila y Tejas, San Luis Potosí, Querétaro, Durango, Guanajuato, Michoacán, Yucatán, Jalisco, Nuevo León, Tamaulipas, and Zacatecas. Several of these states formed their own governments: the Republic of the Rio Grande, the Republic of Yucatán, and the Republic of Texas. Their fierce resistance was possibly fueled by Santa Anna's reprisals committed against his defeated enemies. The New York Post editorialized that "had Santa Anna treated the vanquished with moderation and generosity, it would have been difficult if not impossible to awaken that general sympathy for the people of Texas which now impels so many adventurous and ardent spirits to throng to the aid of their brethren."

The Zacatecas militia, the largest and best supplied of the Mexican states, led by Francisco García Salinas, was well armed with .753 caliber British 'Brown Bess' muskets and Baker .61 rifles. But, after two hours of combat on 12 May 1835, Santa Anna's "Army of Operations" defeated the Zacatecan militia and took almost 3,000 prisoners. He allowed his army to loot Zacatecas City for forty-eight hours. After conquering Zacatecas, he planned to move on to Coahuila y Tejas to quell the rebellion there, which was being supported by settlers from the United States.

=== Texas Revolution, 1835–1836 ===
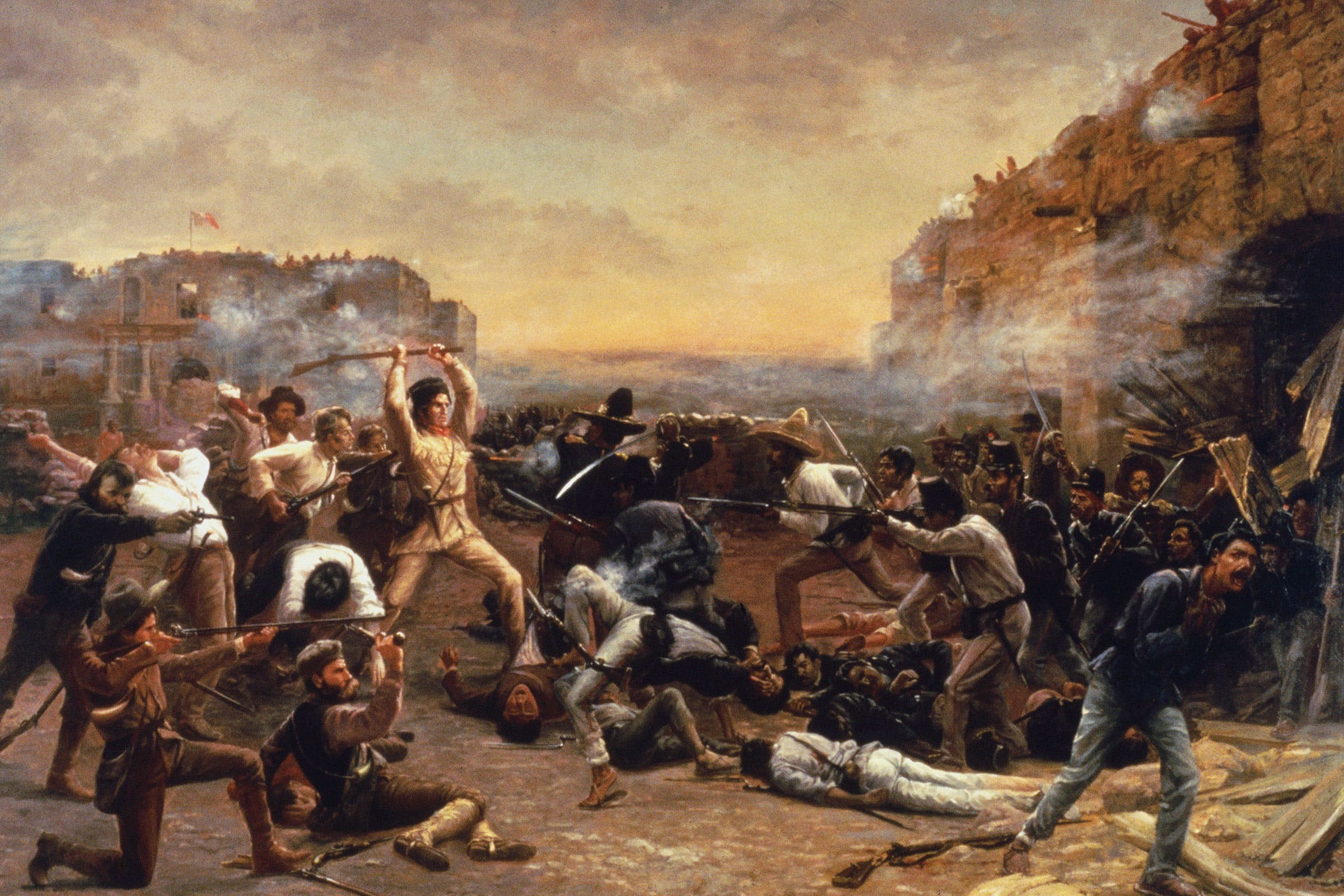
Fall of the Alamo to Santa Anna's forces, 6 March 1836

In 1835, Santa Anna repealed the Mexican constitution, which ultimately led to the beginning of the Texas Revolution. His reasoning for the repeal was that American settlers in Texas were not paying taxes or tariffs, claiming they were not recipients of any services provided by the Mexican government; as a result, new settlers were not allowed there. The new policy was a response to the U.S. attempts to purchase Texas from Mexico. Like other states discontented with the central government, the Texas Department of the Mexican state of Coahuila y Tejas rebelled in late 1835 and declared itself independent on 2 March 1836. The northeastern part of the state had been settled by numerous American immigrants. Moses Austin, the father of Stephen F. Austin, had his party accepted by Spanish authorities in exchange for defense against foreign threats. However, Mexico had declared independence from Spain before the elder Austin died.

Santa Anna marched north to bring Texas back under Mexican control by a brutal show of force. His expedition posed challenges of manpower, logistics, supply and strategy far beyond what he was prepared for, and it ended in disaster. To fund, organize and equip his army, Santa Anna relied, as he often did, on forcing wealthy men to "loan" him funds. He recruited hastily, sweeping up many derelicts and ex-convicts, as well as Indians who could not understand Spanish commands.

Having expected tropical weather, Santa Anna's army suffered from cold, a lack of proper clothing and food shortages. Stretching a supply line far longer than ever before, there were not enough horses, mules, cattle and wagons available, resulting in units never having enough food, fuel, or feed. The medical facilities were minimal and poorly supplied. Morale sank as soldiers realized there were not enough chaplains to properly bury their bodies. Hostile Indians picked off stragglers and foragers. Waterborne sicknesses spread quickly when the men were forced to drink any water they could find on the trail. The officers proved to be mostly incompetent, yet the highly insulated and rigid hierarchy of the army meant that Santa Anna was kept ignorant of these problems.

Santa Anna's forces killed 189 Texan defenders at the Battle of the Alamo on 6 March 1836, and executed more than 342 Texan prisoners at the Goliad Massacre on 27 March 1836. However, his forces suffered unexpectedly heavy casualties. In an 1874 letter, Santa Anna asserted that killing the defenders of Alamo was his only option, stressing that Texan commander William B. Travis was to blame for the degree of violence during the battle. Santa Anna believed that Travis was disrespectful towards him, and that if he had spared the Texans, it would have allowed Sam Houston to establish a dominant position that could threaten him later.

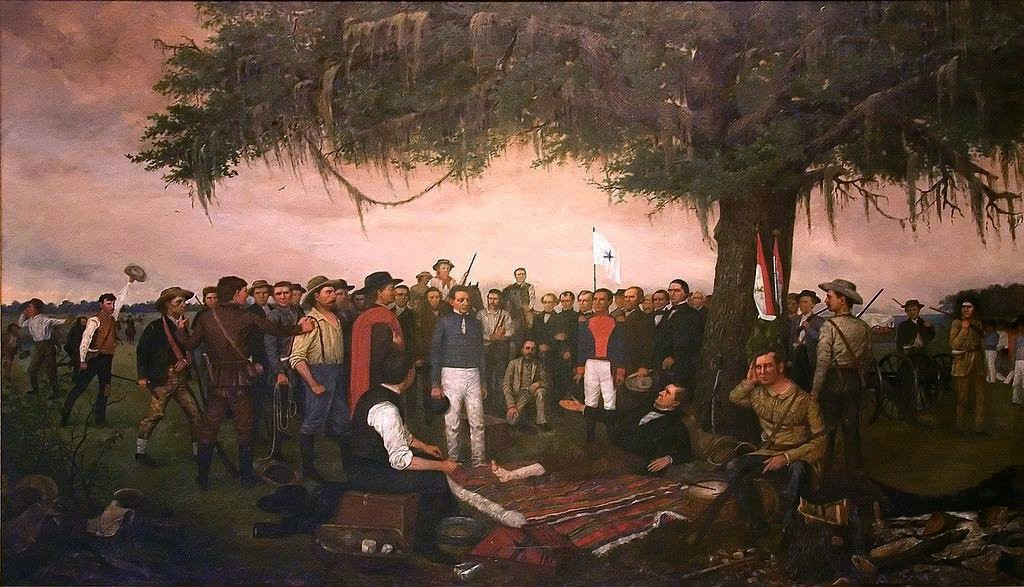
"Surrender of Santa Anna" by William Henry Huddle shows the Mexican president and general surrendering to a wounded Sam Houston, battle of San Jacinto

The Mexican victory at the Alamo bought time for Houston and his Texas forces. During the siege, the Texian Navy had more time to plunder ports along the Gulf of Mexico, and the Texian Army gained more experience and weaponry. Despite Houston's lack of ability to maintain strict control of the Army, they completely routed Santa Anna's much larger army at the Battle of San Jacinto on 21 April 1836. The day after the battle, a small Texan force led by James Austin Sylvester captured Santa Anna near a marsh; the general had hastily dressed himself in a dead Mexican dragoon's uniform but was quickly recognized.

After three weeks in captivity, Texas President David G. Burnet and Santa Anna signed the Treaties of Velasco stating that "in his official character as chief of the Mexican nation, he acknowledged the full, entire, and perfect Independence of the Republic of Texas." In exchange, Burnet and the Texas government guaranteed Santa Anna's safety and transport to Veracruz. Meanwhile, in Mexico City, a new government declared that Santa Anna was no longer president and that the Treaties were null and void. While Santa Anna was held captive in Texas, Poinsett offered a harsh assessment of his situation: "Say to General Santa Anna that when I remember how ardent an advocate he was of liberty ten years ago, I have no sympathy for him now, that he has gotten what he deserves." Santa Anna replied: "Say to Mr. Poinsett that it is very true that I threw up my cap for liberty with great ardor, and perfect sincerity, but very soon found the folly of it. A hundred years to come my people will not be fit for liberty. They do not know what it is, unenlightened as they are, and under the influence of Catholic clergy, a despotism is a proper government for them, but there is no reason why it should not be a wise and virtuous one."

=== Redemption, dictatorship, and exile ===
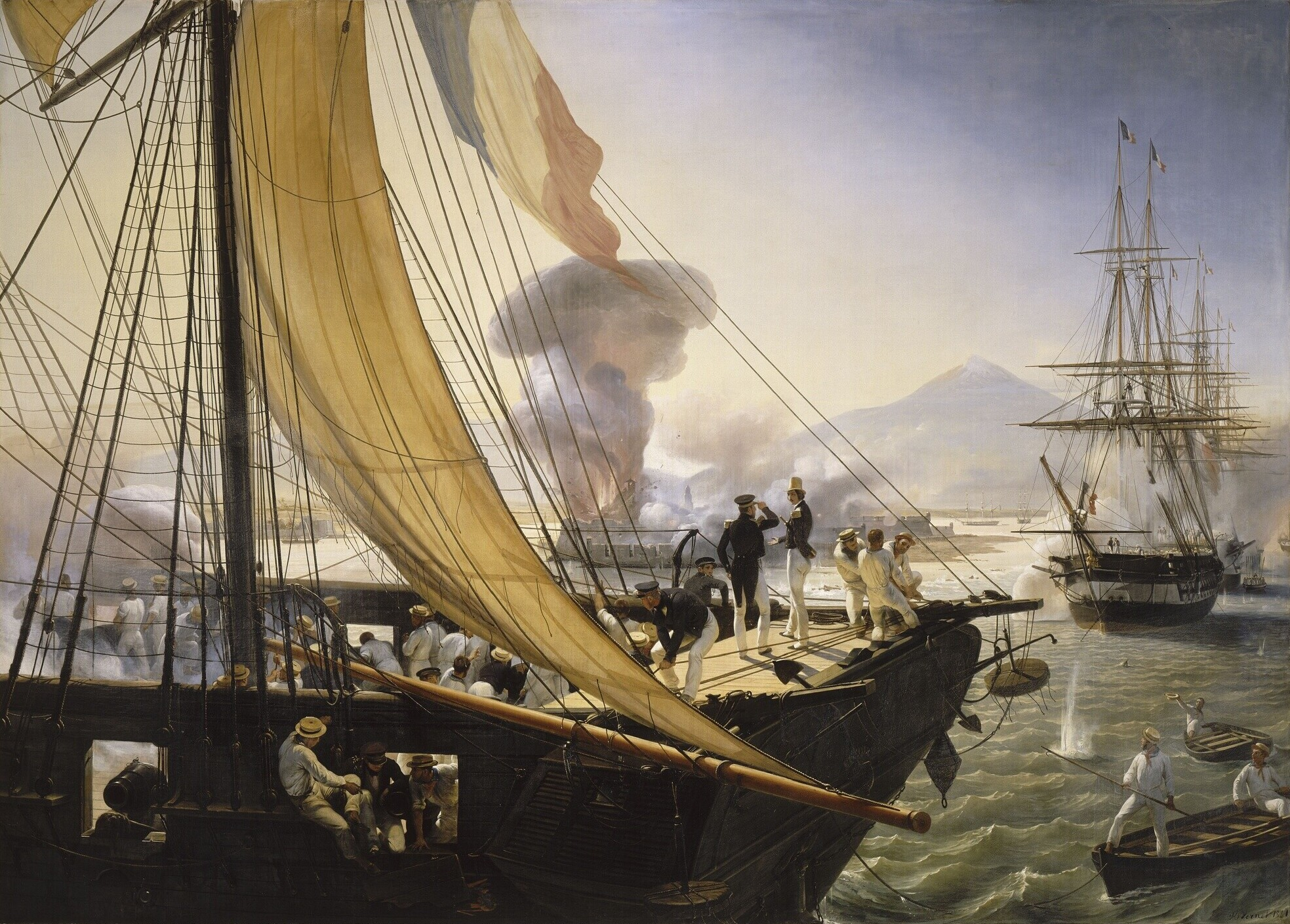
French bombardment of the fort of San Juan de Ulúa in the Pastry War

After some time in exile, and after meeting U.S. President Andrew Jackson in 1837, Santa Anna was allowed to return to Mexico. He was transported aboard the USS Pioneer to retire to his hacienda in Veracruz. There he wrote a manifesto in which he reflected on his experiences and decision-making in Texas.

In 1838, Santa Anna found a chance for redemption from the loss of Texas. After Mexico rejected demands for financial compensation for losses suffered by its citizens, France sent forces that landed in Veracruz in the Pastry War. The Mexican government gave Santa Anna control of the army and ordered him to defend the nation by any means necessary. Santa Anna engaged the French at Veracruz but was forced to retreat after a failed assault, sustaining injuries in his left leg and hand by cannon fire. His shattered ankle required amputation of much of his leg, which he ordered buried with full military honors. Despite Mexico's final capitulation to French demands, Santa Anna used his war service and visible sacrifice to the nation to re-enter Mexican politics.

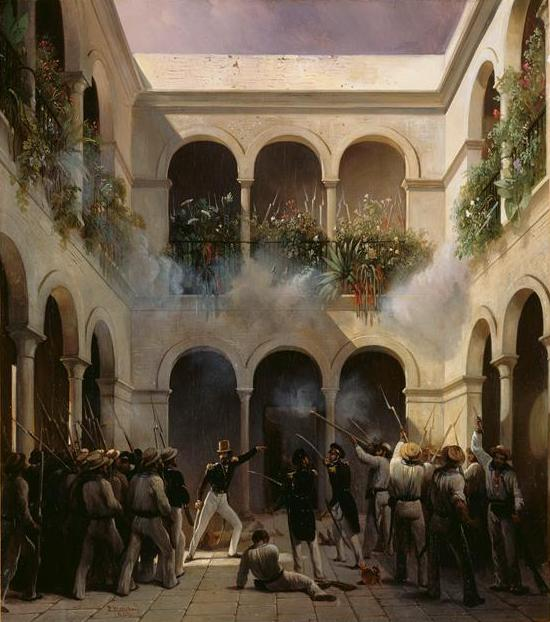
Santa Anna was severely wounded and narrowly escaped capture in the French attack on Veracruz in 1838.

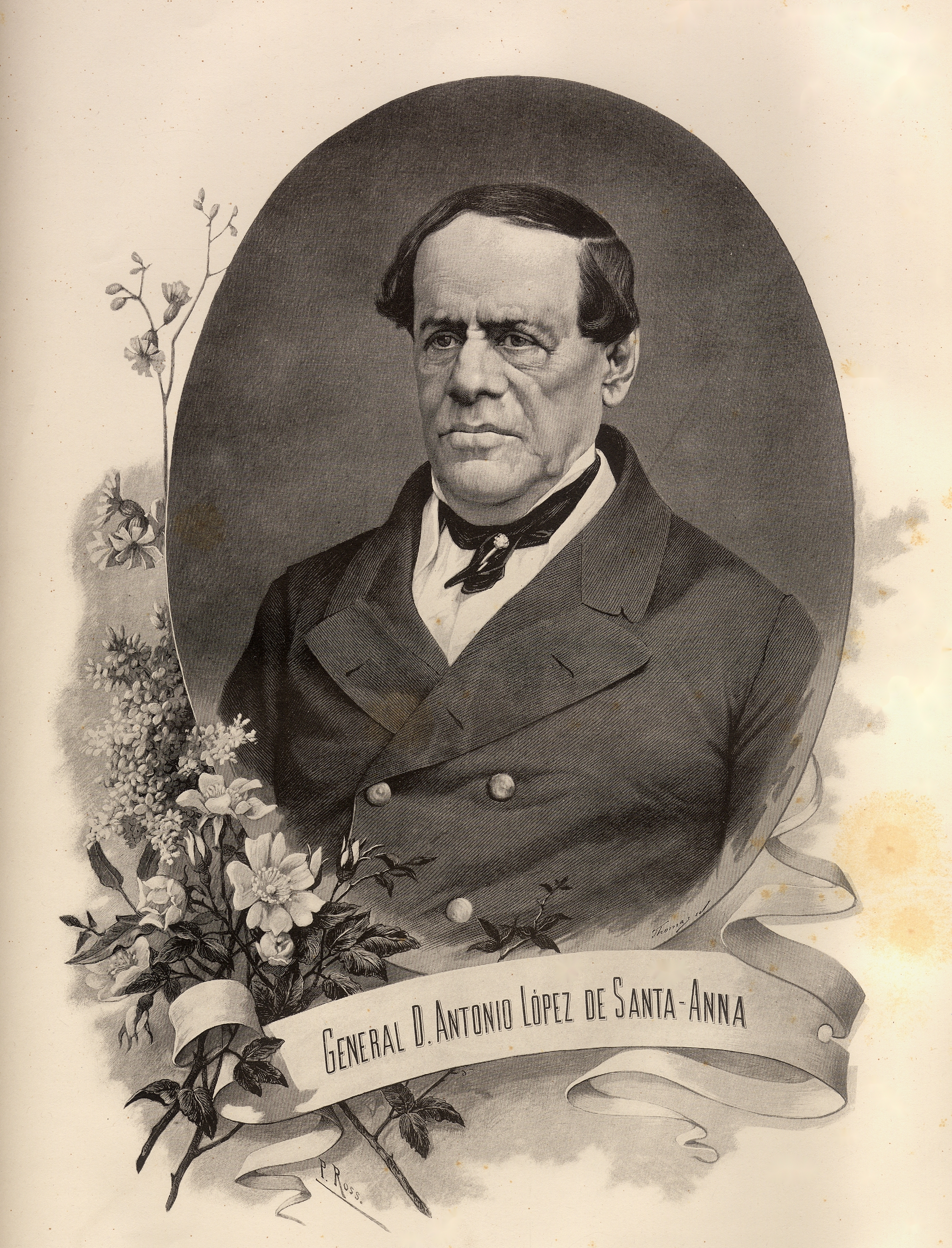
Antonio López de Santa Anna.

Soon after, with Bustamante's presidency descending into chaos, supporters asked Santa Anna to take control of the provisional government. Santa Anna was made president for the fifth time, taking over a nation with an empty treasury. The war with France had weakened the country, and the people were discontented. Also, a rebel army led by Generals José de Urrea and José Antonio Mexía, was marching towards Mexico City in opposition to Santa Anna. Commanding the army, Santa Anna crushed the rebellion in Puebla.

Santa Anna ruled in a more dictatorial fashion than during his first administration. His government banned anti-Santanista newspapers and jailed dissidents to suppress opposition. In 1842, he directed a military expedition into Texas. The action inflicted numerous casualties with no political gain, but Texans began to be persuaded of the potential benefits of annexation by the more powerful U.S.

Following the 1842 elections, at which a new Congress was elected which opposed his rule, Santa Anna attempted to restore the treasury by raising taxes. Several Mexican states stopped dealing with the central government in response, and Yucatán and Laredo declared themselves independent republics. With resentment growing, Santa Anna stepped down and fled Mexico City in December 1844. The buried leg he left behind in the capital was dug up by a mob and dragged through the streets until nothing was left of it. Fearing for his life, Santa Anna tried to elude capture, but in January 1845 he was apprehended by a group of Native Americans near Xico. They turned him over to authorities, and he was imprisoned. Santa Anna's life was ultimately spared, but he was exiled to Cuba.

=== Mexican–American War, 1846–1848 ===
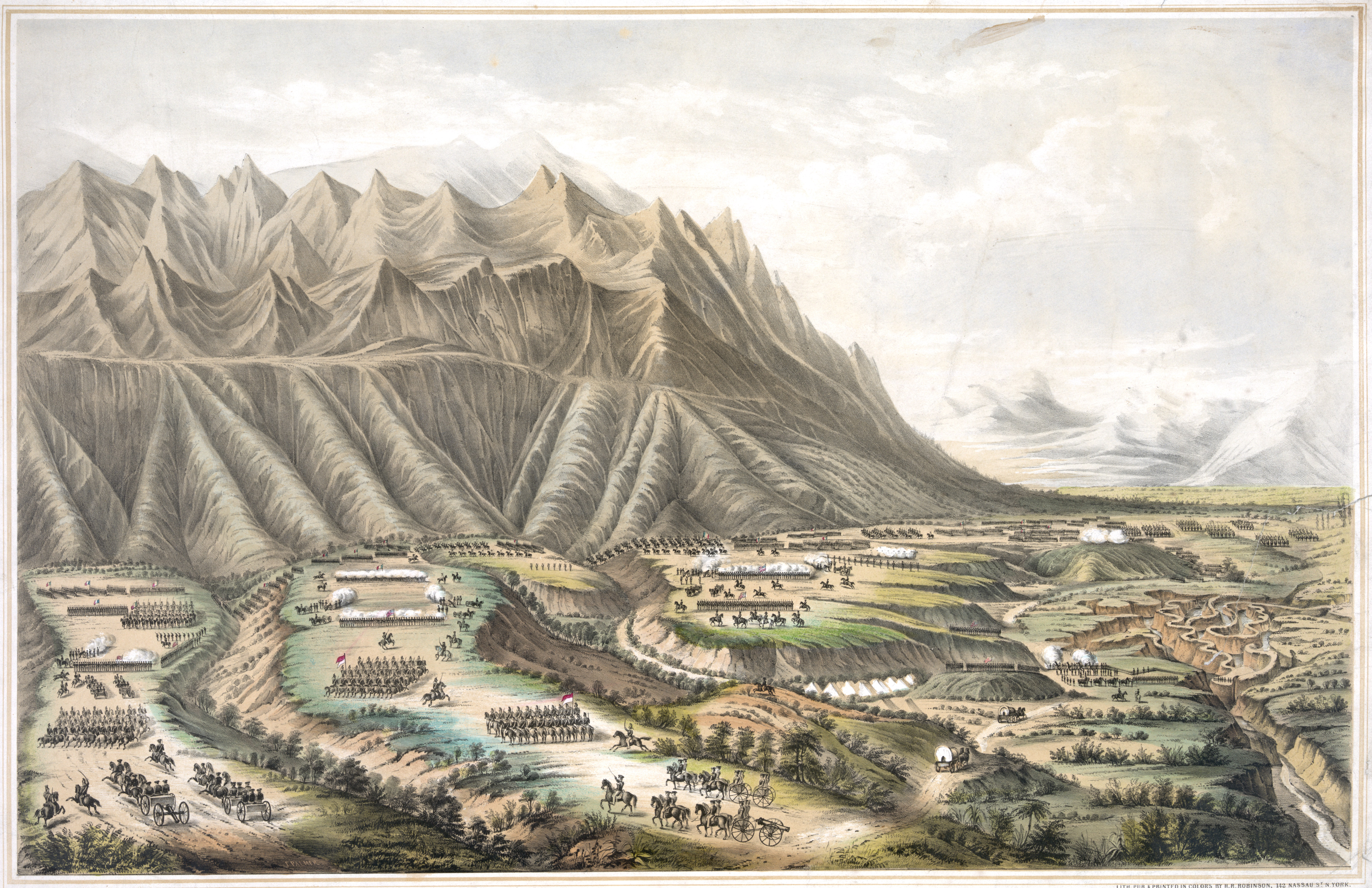
Battle of Buena Vista

In 1846, following American victories at Palo Alto and Resaca de la Palma in the Mexican-American War, President Mariano Paredes was removed from office, with the new government seeking to reinstate the constitution of 1824, with Santa Anna again assuming the presidency. Santa Anna, who had been in exile for only a year, returned to Mexico on 6 August 1846, two days after Paredes' ouster. He wrote to the new government stating he had no aspirations to the presidency but would eagerly use his military experience in the new conflict with the U.S.

U.S. President James K. Polk had hoped to acquire territory in the north by purchase or force, but the Mexican government was not willing to yield. In a gambit to change the dynamic, Polk sent agents to secretly meet with the exiled Santa Anna. They thought they had extracted a promise from him that they would lift a blockade of the Mexican coast to allow him to return and that he would broker a deal. Once back in Mexico at the head of an army, however, Santa Anna reneged on the deal and took up arms against the U.S. invasion.

With no path now for a quick resolution to the conflict in the north, Polk authorized an invasion to take Mexico City, redirecting the bulk of General Zachary Taylor's troops to General Winfield Scott's army. Santa Anna mobilized troops and artillery and rapidly marched north. His forces outnumbered Taylor's, but his troops were exhausted, ill-clothed, hungry and equipped with inferior weapons when the two armies clashed at the Battle of Buena Vista on 22–23 February 1847. Hard fighting over two days brought an inconclusive result, with Santa Anna withdrawing from the field of battle overnight just as complete victory was at hand, taking war trophies such as cannons and battle flags as evidence of his victory. With Scott's army landing at Veracruz, Santa Anna's home ground, he rapidly moved southward to engage with the invaders and protect the capital. For the Mexicans it would have been better if Scott could have been prevented from leaving the Gulf Coast, but they could not prevent Scott's march on Xalapa. Santa Anna set defenses at Cerro Gordo. U.S. forces outflanked him and against strong odds defeated his army.

With that battle, the way was clear for Scott's forces to advance further onto Mexico City. Santa Anna's aim was to protect the capital at all costs and waged defensive warfare, placing strong defenses on the most direct road into the city at El Peñon, which Scott then avoided. Battles at Contreras, Churubusco, and Molino del Rey were lost. At Contreras, Mexican General Gabriel Valencia, an old political and military rival of Santa Anna's, did not recognize his authority as supreme commander and disobeyed his orders as to where his troops should be placed. Valencia's Army of the North was routed. The Battle for Mexico City and the Battle of Chapultepec, like the others, were hard fought losses, and American forces took the capital. "Despite his many faults as a tactician and his overbearing political ambition, Santa Anna was committed to fighting to the bitter end. His actions would prolong the war for at least a year, and more than any other single person it was Santa Anna who denied Polk's dream of a short war."

Perhaps Santa Anna's most personal and ignominious incident in the war was the capture during the Battle of Cerro Gordo of his prosthetic cork leg, which remains as a war trophy in the U.S. held by the Illinois State Military Museum but no longer on display. A second leg, a peg, was also captured by the 4th Illinois and was reportedly used by the soldiers as a baseball bat; it is displayed at the home of Illinois Governor Richard J. Oglesby (who served in the regiment) in Decatur. Santa Anna had a replacement leg made which is displayed at the Museo Nacional de Historia in Mexico City.

The prosthetic leg later played a role in international politics. As relations between the U.S. and Mexico warmed during the run-up to World War II, Illinois was rumored to be ready to return the prosthetic to Mexico and, in 1942, a bill was introduced in the state legislature. The Association of Limb Manufacturers wanted to be part of the repatriation ceremonies. The state passed a non-binding resolution to return the prosthetic, but the National Guard denied the transfer. As of 2025 the leg still resided in the Illinois State Military Museum in Springfield.

=== President for the last time, 1853–1855 ===
Gadsden Purchase of 1854, territory purchased by the U.S. for a better transcontinental railway route

Following Mexico's defeat in 1848, Santa Anna went into exile in Kingston, Jamaica. Two years later, he moved to Turbaco in New Granada (now Colombia). In April 1853, he was invited to return to Mexico by conservatives who had overthrown a weak liberal government, initiated under the Plan de Hospicio, drawn up by the clerics in the cathedral chapter of Guadalajara. Usually, revolts were fomented by military officers; this one was fomented by churchmen. Santa Anna was elected president on 17 March 1853. He honored his promises to the church, revoking a decree denying protection for the fulfillment of monastic vows, a reform promulgated twenty years earlier by Gómez Farías. The Jesuits, who had been expelled from Spanish realms by the crown in 1767, were allowed to return to Mexico ostensibly to educate poorer classes, and much of their property, which the crown had confiscated and sold, was restored to them.

Although he gave himself exalted titles, Santa Anna's situation was quite vulnerable. He declared himself dictator-for-life with the title "Most Serene Highness". His full title in this final period of power was "Hero [benemérito] of the nation, General of Division, Grand Master of the National and Distinguished Order of Guadalupe, Grand Cross of the Royal and Distinguished Spanish Order of Carlos III, and President of the Mexican Republic." The reality was that this administration was no more successful than his earlier ones, dependent on loans from moneylenders and support from conservative elites, the church, and the army.

A major miscalculation was Santa Anna's sale of territory to the U.S. in what became known as the Gadsden Purchase. La Mesilla, the land in northwest Mexico that the U.S. wanted, was much easier terrain for the building of a transcontinental railway in the U.S. The purchase money for the land was supposedly to go to Mexico's empty treasury. Santa Anna was unwilling to wait until the final transaction went through and the boundary line established, wanting access to the money immediately. He bargained with American bankers to get immediate cash, while they gained the right to the revenue when the sale closed. Santa Anna's short-sighted deal netted the Mexican government only $250,000 against credit of $650,000 going to the bankers. James Gadsden thought the amount was likely much higher. A group of liberals including Alvarez, Benito Juárez, and Ignacio Comonfort overthrew Santa Anna under the Plan of Ayutla, which called for his removal from office. He went into exile yet again in 1855.

By the Treaty of Guadalupe Hidalgo the United States paid Mexico only $15 million for the land, which became known as the Mexican Cession.

== Personal life ==
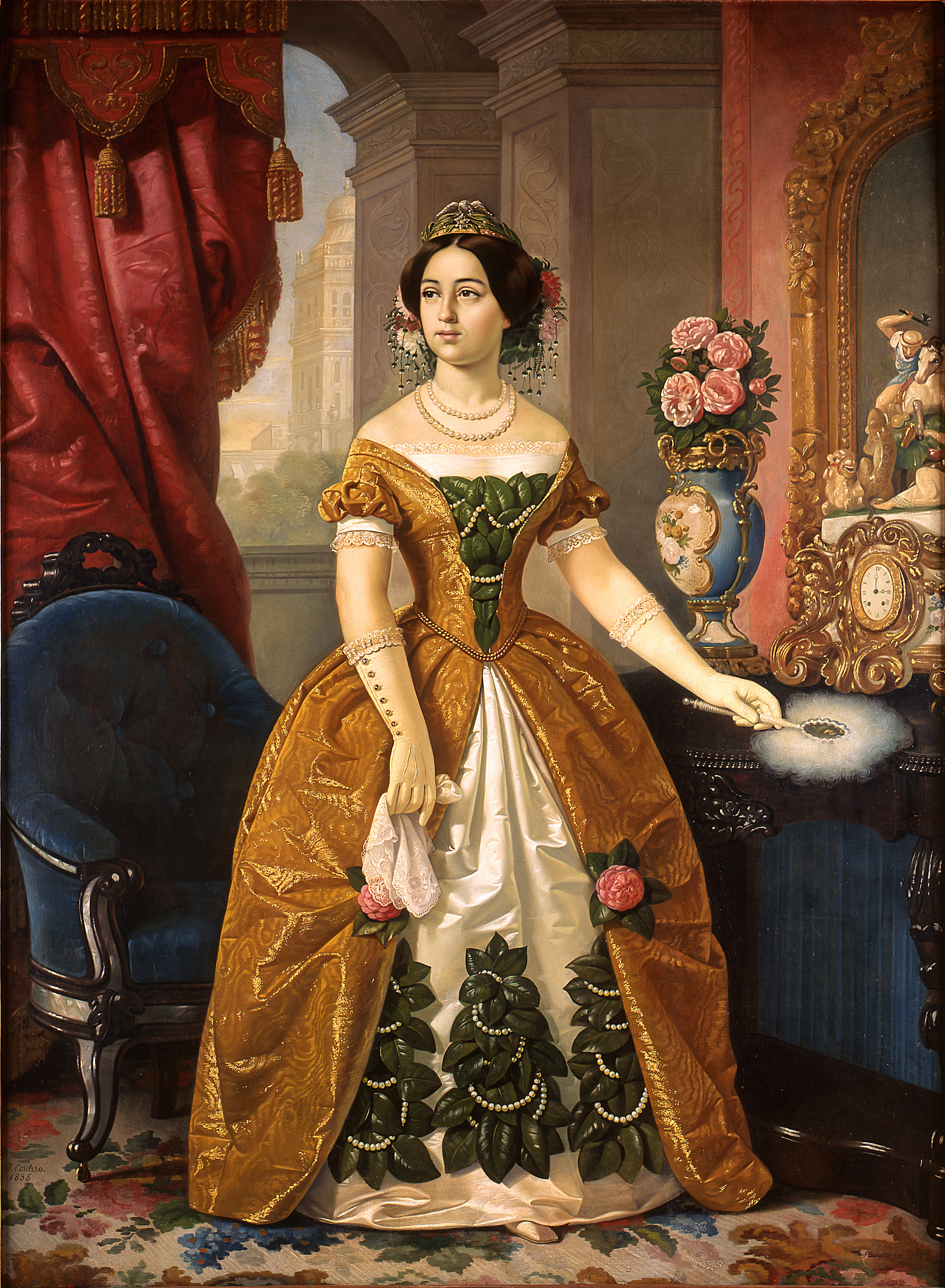
Portrait of Doña Dolores Tosta de Santa Anna by Juan Cordero, 1855. Note her tiara. Santa Anna was considered by some an uncrowned monarch of Mexico.

Santa Anna married twice, both times to wealthy young women. At neither wedding ceremony did he appear, legally empowering his future father-in-law to serve as a proxy at his first wedding and a friend at his second. One assessment of the two marriages is that they were arranged marriages of convenience, bringing considerable wealth to Santa Anna and that his lack of attendance at the ceremonies "appears to confirm that he was purely interested in the financial aspect of the alliance."

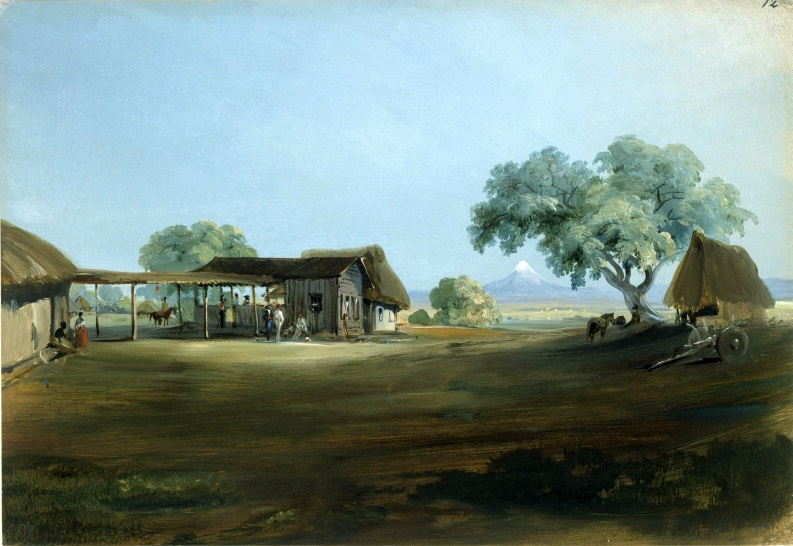
Santa Anna's first and favorite hacienda Manga de Clavo, which his first wife's dowry enabled him to purchase. Painting by Johann Moritz Rugendas. Kuperferstichkabinett, Staatliche Museen Zu Berlin, Id. Number: VIII E. 2440, 1831–1834.

In 1825, Santa Anna married Inés García, the daughter of wealthy Spanish parents in Veracruz, and the couple had four children: María de Guadalupe, María del Carmen, Manuel, and Antonio López de Santa Anna y García. By 1825, Santa Anna had distinguished himself as a military man, joining the movement for independence. When Iturbide lost support, Santa Anna had been in the forefront of leaders seeking to oust him. Although his family was of modest means, Santa Anna was of good creole lineage; the García family may well have seen a match between their young daughter and the up-and-coming Santa Anna as advantageous. Inés' dowry allowed Santa Anna to purchase the first of his haciendas, Manga de Clavo, in Veracruz.

The first Spanish ambassador to Mexico and his wife, Fanny Calderón de la Barca, visited with Inés at Manga de Clavo, where they were well-received with a breakfast banquet. Calderón de la Barca observed that "After breakfast, the Señora having dispatched an officer for her cigar-case, which was gold with a diamond latch, offered me a cigar, which I having declined, she lighted her own, a little paper 'cigarette', and the gentlemen followed her good example."

In 1842, Santa Anna purchased El Encero (now Hacienda del Lencero) near Xalapa city, in the state of Veracruz.

Two months after the death of his wife Inés in 1844, the 50-year-old Santa Anna married 16-year-old María de los Dolores de Tosta. The couple rarely lived together; De Tosta resided primarily in Mexico City, and Santa Anna's political and military activities took him around the country. They had no children, leading biographer Will Fowler to speculate that either the marriage was primarily platonic or De Tosta was infertile.

Several women claimed to have borne Santa Anna natural children. In his will, he acknowledged and made provisions for four: Paula, María de la Merced, Petra, and José López de Santa Anna. Biographers have identified three more: Pedro López de Santa Anna, and Ángel and Augustina Rosa López de Santa Anna.

== Later years and death ==
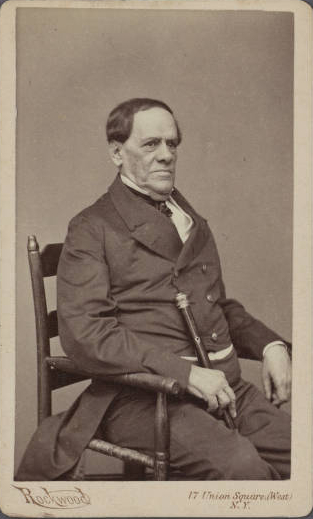
Santa Anna photographed by George G. Rockwood, c.1870

From 1855 to 1874, Santa Anna lived in exile in Cuba, the United States, Colombia, and Saint Thomas in the Danish West Indies (now the US Virgin Islands). He had left Mexico because of his unpopularity with the Mexican people after his defeat in 1848. Santa Anna participated in gambling and businesses with the hopes that he would become rich. During his many years in exile, he was a passionate fan of the sport of cockfighting; he had many roosters that he entered into competitions and would have his roosters compete with cocks from all over the world.

In the 1850s, Santa Anna traveled to New York City with a shipment of chicle, which he intended to sell for use in making carriage wheels. He attempted but was unsuccessful in convincing U.S. wheel manufacturers that this substance could be more useful in tires than the materials they were originally using. Although he introduced chewing gum to the U.S., Santa Anna did not make any money from the product. Thomas Adams, the American assigned to aid Santa Anna while he was in the U.S., experimented with chicle in an attempt to use it as a substitute for rubber. He bought one ton of the substance from Santa Anna, but his experiments proved unsuccessful. Instead, Adams helped to found the chewing gum industry with a product that he called "chiclets".

In 1865, Santa Anna attempted to return to Mexico and offer his services during the French invasion, seeking once again to play the role as the country's defender and savior, only to be refused by Juárez. Later that year a schooner owned by Gilbert Thompson, son-in-law of Daniel Tompkins, brought Santa Anna to his home in Staten Island, where he tried to raise money for an army to return and take over Mexico City.

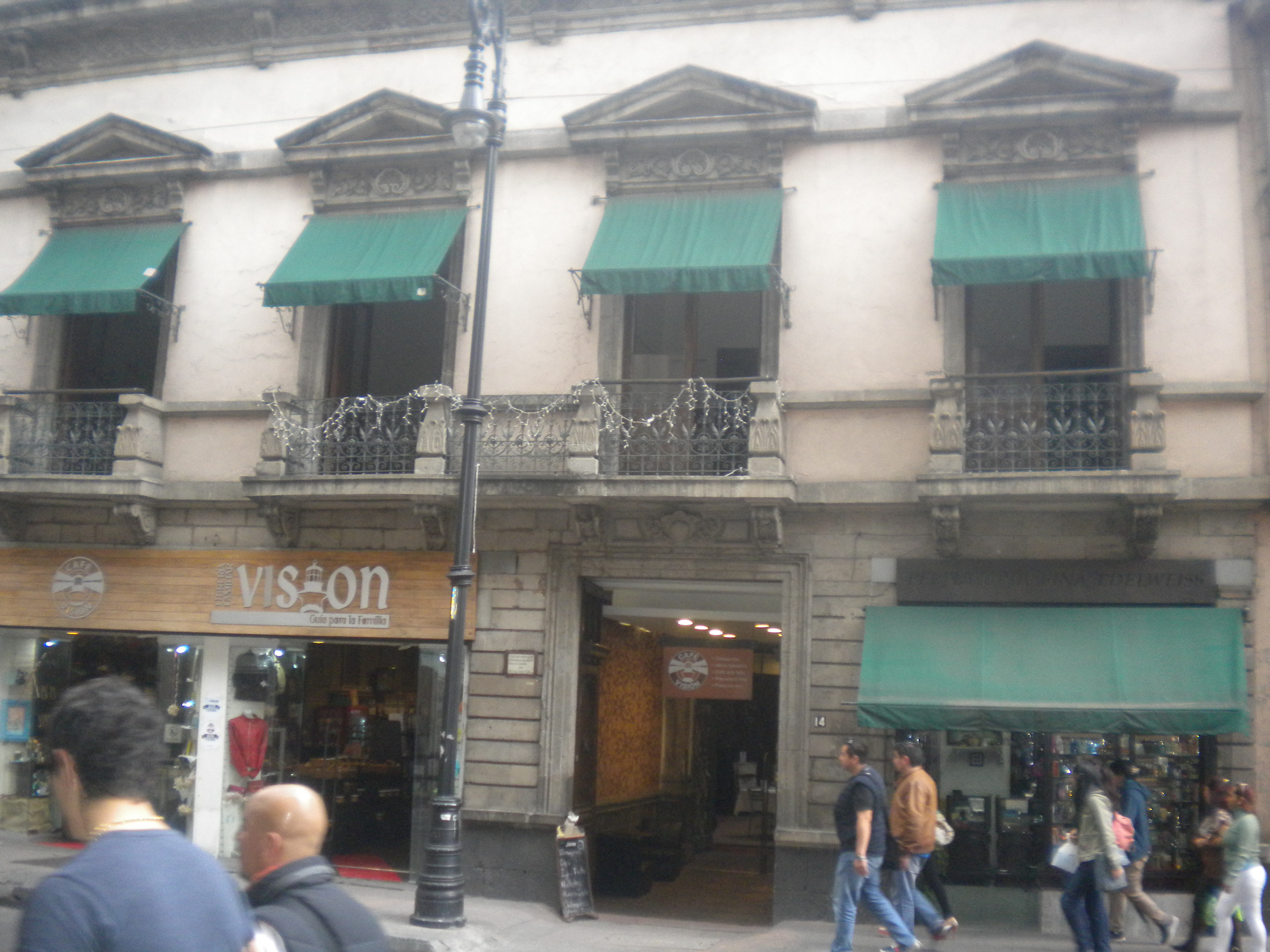
The house in Mexico City where Santa Anna spent the last years of his life and wrote most of his memoirs.

In 1874, Santa Anna took advantage of a general amnesty issued by President Sebastián Lerdo de Tejada and returned to Mexico, by then crippled and almost blind from cataracts. He died at his home in Mexico City on 21 June 1876 at age 82. Santa Anna was buried with full military honors in a glass coffin in Panteón del Tepeyac Cemetery.

== Legacy ==
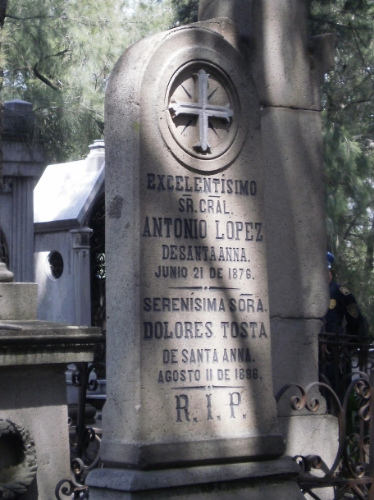
Grave of Santa Anna and his second wife, Sra. Dolores Tosta de Santa Anna

Santa Anna was highly controversial at the time and ever since. In the 2007 biography by Will Fowler, he was depicted as, "a liberal, a Republican, an army man, a hero, a revolutionary, a regional strongman, but never a politician. He presented himself as a mediator who was both anti-party and anti-politics in the decades when the new country of Mexico was wracked by factional infighting. He was always more willing to lead an army than to lead his country".

But as a military leader, Gates Brown, a historian at the U.S. Army Command and General Staff College, considers Santa Anna among history's worst for his mistakes in two wars which cost Mexico much of its territory. In the Texas Revolution, time was on his side at the Alamo since he knew the defenders were not being reinforced and would eventually have to surrender. Brown writes that he should have waited and built a logistical base at San Antonio to support further operations. Instead, he opted to attack after less than two weeks, losing more men than the defenders did, a large proportion of them experienced veterans. "He had sacrificed a third of his force", Brown writes, "to take a garrison that had to fall, with or without this assault." Outrage over the executions of Texans there and at Goliad built far more popular support for the rebellion than the Texans had themselves managed. Santa Anna's defeat and capture at San Jacinto was also abetted by his mistaken belief that Houston would not attack with a smaller force and troops as tired as his own.

Later, in the Mexican-American War, Santa Anna's decision to march newly recruited and inexperienced troops across 385 kilometres (239 mi) of desert in wintertime without stopping to resupply, in hopes of ending the war with a quick defeat of Zachary Taylor's forces, contributed to the much greater Mexican casualty count at Buena Vista. At Cerro Gordo he dismissed suggestions from Manuel Robles Pezuela, one of his officers, that he reinforce the Atalaya hill's defenses, believing the terrain made that unnecessary. The U.S. attack up that hill the next day, combined with a flanking maneuver, cost Mexico its only chance to halt General Winfield Scott's advance on Mexico City before the outskirts of the city itself.

Historians note that Antonio López de Santa Anna became prominent in Tejano folk memory because of his role in the Texas Revolution and the Battle of the Alamo. Later generations would reshape his image to serve cultural and political narratives. Texas educators, writers, and public officials throughout the nineteenth and twentieth centuries portrayed Santa Anna as the central antagonist in the broader story of how Texas gained independence. Historian Will Fowler says that this retrospective framing of Santa Anna contributes to exaggerated personal influence, transforming Santa Anna into a symbol of Mexican autocracy, rather than a complex political figure navigating Mexican internal instability during the nineteenth century.

In his dissertation Inventing the Alamo, Stephen Oleszek argues that Santa Anna’s rise as a Texas folk legend was closely related to the myth-making and storytelling process that surrounds the Alamo. Oleszek explains that in early Texas, memorial associations and historians sought to establish a distinct hero-villain identity between Texas and Mexico to promote unity amongst Anglo-Americans and to justify the memorialization of the Texas Revolution. Specifically, Santa Anna was portrayed as the embodiment of despotism, while Alamo defenders such as William B. Travis and James Bowie were portrayed as heroic and brave. This theme has been ingrained throughout textbooks, media, and the slogan, "Remember the Alamo!", which have presented an oversimplified narrative to generations of Texans.

More recent works, specifically Santa Anna in Texas: A Mexican American Viewpoint, challenge these ideas by examining the military and political aspect of Santa Anna’s strategies to suppress the Texian Army in 1836. Presley says that Mexican perspectives on Santa Anna were actually divided, and in most cases, did not align with the villainous narrative found in Texan historiography.

Historians debate the exact number of his presidencies, as he would often share power and make use of puppet rulers; biographer Will Fowler gives the figure of six terms while the Texas State Historical Association claims five. Historian of Latin America, Alexander Dawson, counts eleven times that Santa Anna assumed the presidency, often for short periods. The University of Texas Libraries cites the same figure of eleven times, but adds Santa Anna was only president for six years due to short terms.

Santa Anna's legacy has subsequently come to be viewed as profoundly negative, with historians and many Mexicans ranking him as "the principal inhabitant even today of Mexico's black pantheon of those who failed the nation." He is considered one of the most unpopular and controversial Mexican presidents of the 19th century.

== In popular culture ==
- He features in several 19th-century-origin British sea shanties, including one frequently known as "Santianna", "Santy Anno", or many other names, which has been frequently recorded by many folk musicians.
- He is played by Rubén Padilla (Mexican actor, not to be confused with the homonymous American athlete) in the John Wayne film The Alamo.
- Fox animated series King of the Hill season 2 episode 18 "The Final Shinsult" largely revolves around Santa Anna's prosthetic leg.
- In the 1998 film The Mask of Zorro, Santa Anna is mentioned and is portrayed by Joaquim de Almeida in an alternate ending.
- He is played by Emilio Echevarría in the 2004 film The Alamo.
- He is played by J. Carrol Naish in the 1955 film The Last Command.
- He appears in 2025's Civilization VII as one of Mexico's special Revolucionario Units.

== See also ==
- History of democracy in Mexico
- List of heads of state of Mexico

== Sources ==
- Brown, Gates (2022). "Antonio López de Santa Anna". In Jennings, John M.; Steele, Chuck (eds.). The Worst Military Leaders in History. London: Reaktion Books. ISBN 9781789145830.
- Camnitzer, Luis (2009). Weiss, Rachel (ed.). On Art, Artists, Latin America, and Other Utopias. University of Texas Press. p. 199. ISBN 9780292783492.
- Fowler, Will (2000). Tornel and Santa Anna: the writer and the caudillo, Mexico, 1795–1853. Greenwood Publishing Group. p. 20. ISBN 978-0-313-30914-4.
- Fowler, Will (2009). Santa Anna of Mexico. U of Nebraska Press. ISBN 978-0-8032-2638-8.
- Olavarría y Ferrari, Enrique de (1880). Vicente Riva Palacio (ed.). México a través de los siglos (in Spanish). México: Ballescá y Cía. pp. 210–226.
- Mead, Teresa (2016). A History of Modern Latin America (2 ed.). UK: John Wiley & Sons Inc. pp. 126–127. ISBN 978-1405120517.

Political offices
Preceded by Valentín Gómez Farías	President of Mexico; 17 May – 4 June 1833	Succeeded by Valentín Gómez Farías
Preceded by Valentín Gómez Farías	President of Mexico; 18 June – 5 July 1833	Succeeded by Valentín Gómez Farías
Preceded by Valentín Gómez Farías	President of Mexico; 27 October – 15 December 1833	Succeeded by Valentín Gómez Farías
Preceded by Valentín Gómez Farías	President of Mexico; 24 April 1834 – 27 January 1835	Succeeded by Miguel Barragán
Preceded by Anastasio Bustamante	Interim President of Mexico; 20 March – 10 July 1839	Succeeded by Nicolás Bravo
Preceded by Francisco Javier Echeverría	Provisional President of Mexico; 10 October 1841 – 26 October 1842	Succeeded by Nicolás Bravo
Preceded by Nicolás Bravo	Provisional President of Mexico; 4 March – 4 October 1843	Succeeded by Valentín Canalizo
Preceded by Valentín Canalizo	Provisional President of Mexico; 4 June – 12 September 1844	Succeeded by José Joaquín de Herrera
Preceded by Valentín Gómez Farías	Interim President of Mexico; 21 March – 2 April 1847	Succeeded by Pedro María de Anaya
Preceded by Pedro María de Anaya	Interim President of Mexico; 20 May – 15 September 1847	Succeeded by Manuel de la Peña y Peña
Preceded by Manuel María Lombardini	Dictator-President of Mexico; 20 April 1853 – 12 August 1855	Succeeded by Martín Carrera
