= USS Pioneer (1836) =

United States Naval Vessel

History

United States
- Builder: Gosport Navy Yard
- Launched: 1836
- Out of service: 1844

General characteristics
- Sail plan: Barque

The first USS Pioneer was most likely a barque in the United States Navy, although some reports classify her a frigate and others as a brig.

Pioneer was built in 1836 at the Norfolk Naval Shipyard. Commanded by Josiah Tattnall III, she carried General Santa Anna to Veracruz from Washington, D.C. in 1837. She most likely left service in 1844.
