= Francisco Javier Echeverría =

President of Mexico in 1841

The Most Excellent Francisco Javier Echeverría
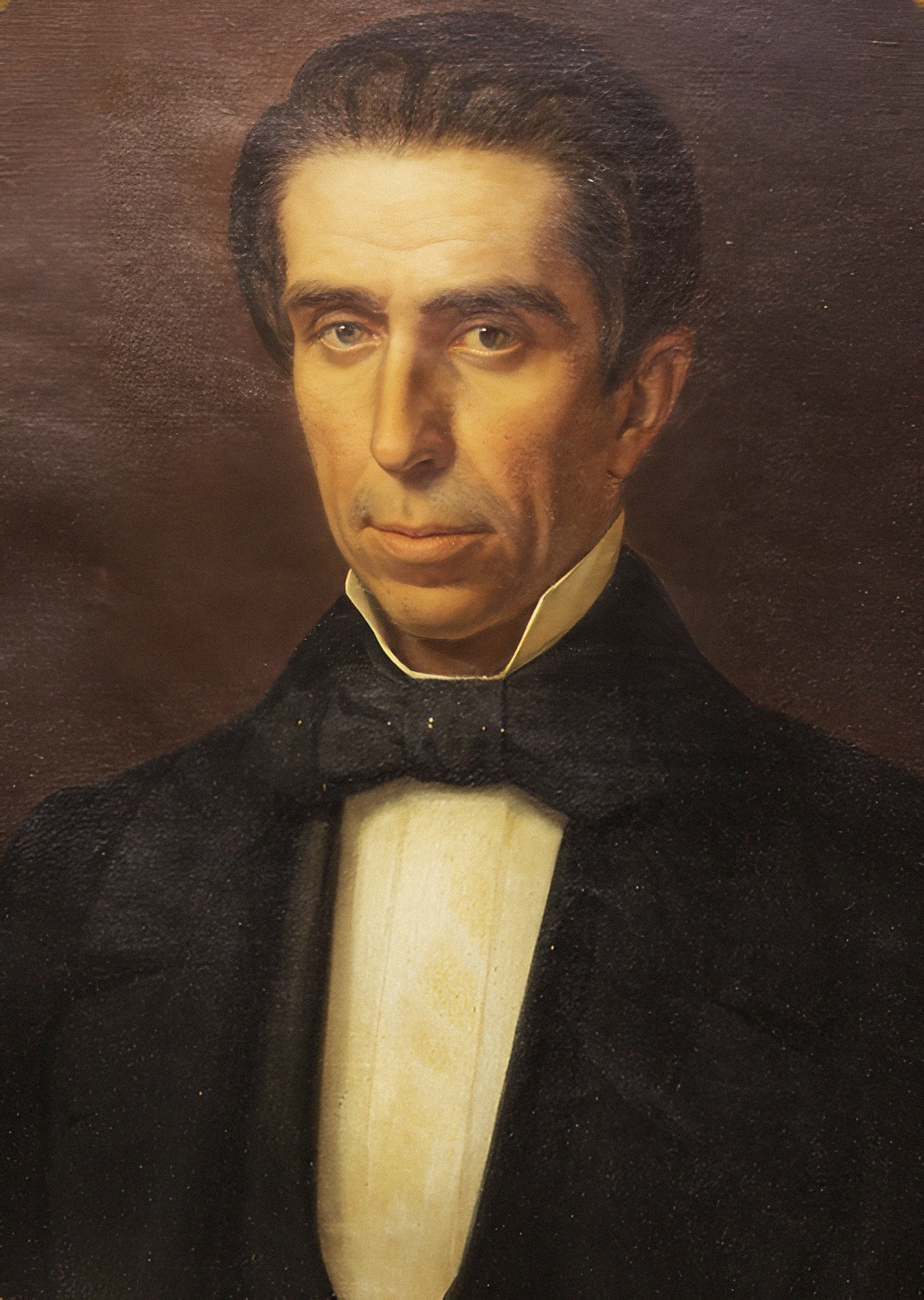

12th President of Mexico
- In office 22 September – 10 October 1841
- Preceded by: Anastasio Bustamante
- Succeeded by: Antonio López de Santa Anna

Personal details
- Born: c. 2 July 1797 Jalapa, Veracruz
- Died: 17 September 1852 (aged 55) Mexico City
- Party: Conservative Party
- Spouse: Refugio Almanza

Francisco Javier Echeverría (c. 2 July 1797 – 17 September 1852) was a Mexican businessman and finance minister who served as interim president of Mexico for about two weeks in late September 1841, during the fall of Anastasio Bustamante's administration.

Santa Anna and Mariano Paredes had started an uprising against the government and President Bustamante left Echeverria, vice president of the council of state in charge of the presidency while he went to personally command the troops, an effort that was ultimately unsuccessful. The government surrendered on October 6. Echeverria would return to politics as a congressman in 1850.

== Early life ==
Francisco Javier Echeverría was born to a wealthy family in Xalapa, Veracruz. He was the son of Pedro Miguel Echeverría Meoqui (1758–1830), a Navarrese merchant and a prominent and respected member of the Veracruz City Council and the Consulate of Merchants of Veracruz, and María del Rosario Francisca Migoni Godoy (1760–1837), a Veracruz native who devoted herself to domestic life. In his youth he was affectionately known as "la naríz" or "the nose". He worked in his family's commercial firm until 1829 when he entered politics. He was elected a deputy in the local congress in 1829. In 1834, he moved to Mexico City, where he headed the family firm of Viuda de Echeverría e Hijos.

== Political career ==
=== Finance Minister ===
As a conservative, he was called on May of that same year to work at the Ministry of Finance for the newly ascended conservative Santa Anna administration, but Echeverria disagreed with the president in sustaining the federal system as opposed to a centralist system and he resigned from the government in September. One of the reasons he was opposed to a federal system was his view that the finances of the nation could be more efficiently managed through one central agency as opposed to being managed by separate state governments.

In 1836 under the presidency of Anastasio Bustamante, he was called to the council of state, and was charged with various financial tasks. After the Pastry War of 1838 he once again joined the ministry at a time when the nation's finances were in ruins since the French had blockaded all the ports and associated customs.

More than half of the budget had to go to paying off bonds and the deficit. He raised to taxes so that by the time he left his post on March, 1841 government revenue averaged at half a real per person monthly, but such a rate was also accused of encouraging fraud and burdening the economy. Nonetheless, he managed to pay five million pesos off of the internal debt. One of his last acts was a land tax.

=== Interim Presidency ===
Echeverria did not accomplish anything of notability during his short presidency amidst an insurrection he was not able to defeat or even mitigate. Ex-President Bustamante, as a last resort decided to proclaim his support for the federal system in order to divide his opposition. The ploy did not work, but did disillusion Echeverria a staunch supporter of the centralist system, who subsequently resigned. The insurgents were triumphant and Bustamante officially surrendered power through the Estanzuela Accords on October 6, 1841.

== Later life ==
He was elected to the Mexican Congress in 1850, where he continued to champion his conservative ideals. He was a member of many charity organizations and was also president of the Academy of San Carlos which he saved from ruin and which then flourished into a well furnished institution with European teachers. He also founded a reformatory for young men. Echeverria died on September 17, 1855, at the age of fifty five.

== See also ==
- List of heads of state of Mexico

Political offices
Preceded by Anastasio Bustamante	President of Mexico; 22 September - 10 October 1841	Succeeded by Antonio López de Santa Anna
