= José María Tornel =

Mexican politician

José María Tornel y Mendívil
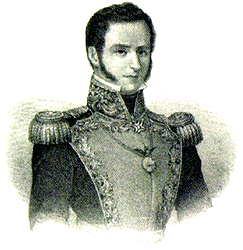

Governor of the Federal District
- In office 24 November 1833 – 12 January 1835
- Preceded by: José Ignacio Esteva
- Succeeded by: Ramon Lopez Rayon
- In office 23 February 1828 – 3 December 1828
- Preceded by: José Ignacio Esteva
- Succeeded by: José Ignacio Esteva

Governor of Veracruz
- In office 1828–1829
- Preceded by: Miguel Barragán
- Succeeded by: Sebastian Camacho Castilla

Personal details
- Born: March 1, 1795 Orizaba, Veracruz, New Spain
- Died: 1853 (aged 57–58) Tacubaya, Mexico City

José María de Tornel y Mendívil (1795–1853) was a 19th-century creole (Mexican Spanish descent) Mexican army general, attorney and politician who greatly influenced Mexico's political stage and the career of President Antonio López de Santa Anna.

== Birth ==
José Maria Tornel y Mendívil was born March 1, 1795, in the town of Orizaba, Veracruz, New Spain to Julian Tornel, a prominent local businessman, and Manuela Jacinta Bernarda Mendívil Vidal.

== Career ==
Tornel was prominent among the "santanistas" a group of politicians and officials who helped Santa Anna return to power frequently, despite defeats in the 1836 Texas Revolution and the 1846–48 Mexican–American War. Tornel advocated a federalist agenda in the 1820s. During that time, Tornel y Mendivil became Mexico's first president Guadalupe Victoria's right arm.

1813 was the year Tornel joined the insurgency. During the Mexican War of Independence he was taken prisoner and sentenced to demise. President Guadelupe Victoria (1824-1829) and Antonio López de Santa Anna (1821) were soon to acquire Tornel as their private secretary. President Victoria named Tornel the Mexican ambassador to the United States in 1830. His mission was to inform Victoria on Americans' ambitions to take Texas. Tornel was a bitter enemy of American policies. He complained to the Jackson administration about its failure to honor Mexico's laws prohibiting further migration of Americans to Texas. He also tried and failed to secure a firm boundary along the Sabine River. Thanks his reports, Victoria's government came victorious in the Fredonian Rebellion. Although Tornel supported federalism during the Victoria presidency, he changed his political views to support Santa Anna's reactionary dictatorship in the 1850s. Tornel helped orchestrate the Plan of Cuernavaca revolt in 1834. Tornel served as Minister of War, and helped plan the campaign that led to the Battle of the Alamo.

He was the President of the Chamber of Deputies in 1828 and 1841.

General Tornel's descendants continue to live in Mexico City. A street is named after him in the San Miguel Chapultepec borough in Mexico City.

== Works ==
- The "Tornel Decree" of December 30, 1835 (a key element in the Texas Revolution, giving Santa Anna license to execute all prisoners).
- October 12, 1842 Speech to the Constituent Congress;
- Military Expenses of Iniquity, Barbarism and Despotism of the Spanish Government, Executed in the Towns of Orizava and Córdoba;
- Brief historical review of the most notable events in the Mexican nation;
- Brief historical review of the most notable events of the Mexican nation: [from 1821 to the present day];
- The Mexican Side of the Texas Revolution;

== Bibliography ==
- Fowler, Will (2000). Tornel and Santa Anna: The Writer and the Caudillo, Mexico, 1795–1853. Westport, Conn.: Greenwood Press. ISBN 0-313-30914-0. Archived from the original on 2018-10-11 – via Questia.
- Fowler, Will (2007). Santa Anna of Mexico. University of Nebraska Press. ISBN 978-0-8032-5646-0 – via Project MUSE.
- Haynes, Sam W.; Saxon, Gerald D.; Cantrell, Gregg; Schlereth, Eric (2015). Contested Empire: Rethinking the Texas Revolution. Texas A&M University Press. ISBN 978-1-62349-310-3 – via Project MUSE.
- Jackson, Jack; Wheat, John (2005). Almonte's Texas: Juan N. Almonte's 1834 Inspection, Secret Report & Role in the 1836 Campaign. Denton, TX: Texas State Historical Association. ISBN 978-0-87611-207-6 – via Portal to Texas History.
