= Hacienda del Lencero =

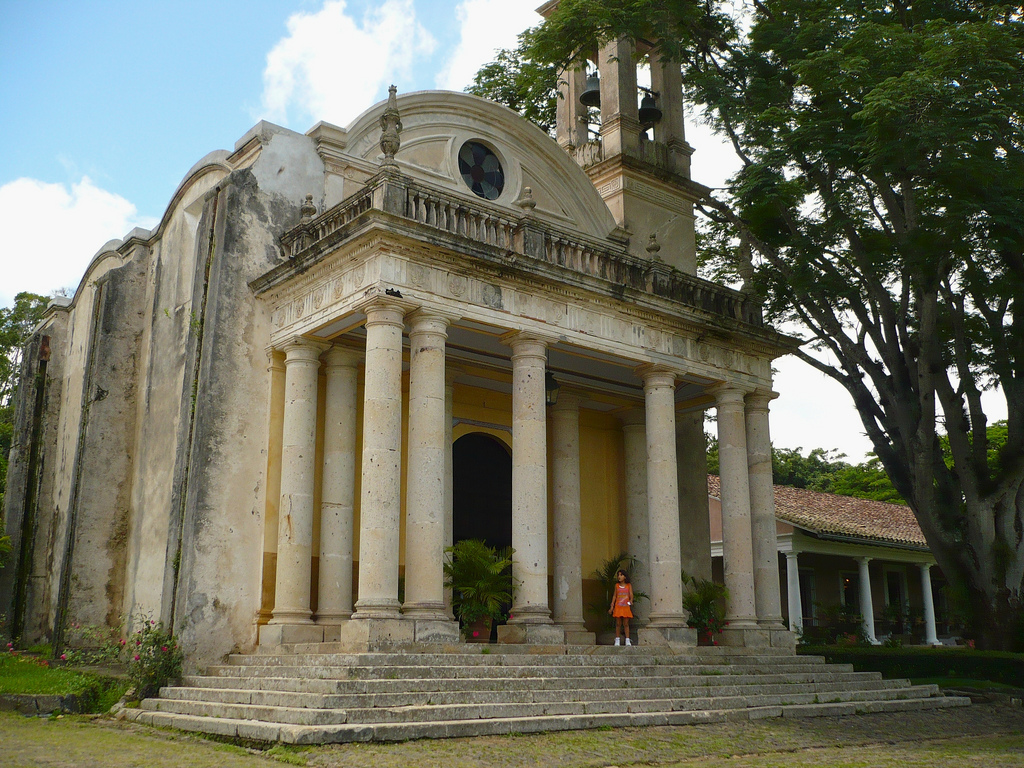

The Hacienda del Lencero is a Spanish Colonial architecture era building and gardens located near of Xalapa city, in the state of Veracruz in eastern Mexico. The house dates back to 1525 and takes its name from Juan Lencero, a soldier of Hernán Cortés. It was the property of Antonio López de Santa Anna in the 19th century.

== History ==
The origins of El Lencero date back to 1525, when the lands were granted to a soldier of Hernán Cortés, Juan Lencero. The site was located along what was called the "Cortés route" — the expedition route from San Juan de Ulúa to the meeting with Moctezuma Xocoyotzin in Tenochtitlán. After the conquest of Mexico and the establishment of the "camino real" (Veracruz–Mexico route), Lencero and other soldiers, including Juan Sedeño and Alonso de Aguilar, were granted lands and commercial sites to establish inns along the road. According to Juárez Martínez (1979), El Lencero was one of the first inns founded on the route, making the town of Xalapa and its surrounding region a "mandatory passage area."

The hacienda — formerly called El Encero — like others such as Las Ánimas or Lucas Martín, frequently changed ownership and was often subject to speculation due to its location along the camino real and mortgage debts. From 1590, El Lencero and nearby haciendas such as La Concepción and La Orduña had sugar mills and trapiches for sugar production, as well as African slaves until the late 18th century. Lencero later became a Mercedarian friar. In 1595, Jerónimo Pérez de Salazar purchased the estate from innkeeper Hipólito Hernández.

During the 17th century, the estate owners also cultivated sugarcane and raised livestock. Sánchez Gómez (1979) notes that the estate was mainly devoted to cattle and sugar production, practices continued by its many owners from the 18th to 19th centuries. In the 19th century, coffee was also grown at the hacienda, along with cotton textiles, bricks, and roof tiles.

In 1788, an appraisal of the estate estimated sixteen "suertes" of sugarcane planted on six hectares, valued at 5,670 "common gold pesos".

On 27 May 1842, Antonio López de Santa Anna purchased El Encero — 1,450 fanegas including chapel and main house — for 50,000 pesos (or 45,000 pesos) — from Juan Francisco Caraza. Two years later, the estate had expanded by 200% through purchases of surrounding lands.

In October 1844, the Franciscan priest José Francisco Campomanes ratified Santa Anna's second marriage with Dolores de Tosta y Gómez. While serving as president, Santa Anna often retired to his estates, including El Lencero, due to his "dislike of the capital" and his "provincial middle-class background". On 5 April 1847, Santa Anna arrived at the hacienda and organized an army to defend against the United States invasion, fortifying strategic points such as Cerro Gordo and Puente Nacional.

== Historic house museum ==
Today, it is a historic house museum which displays furniture and items dating from this period. It also has a chapel and spacious gardens surrounding the property which include a sculpture by Gabriela Mistral who spent time there while in exile.
