= Francisco García Salinas =

Mexican politician (1786–1841)

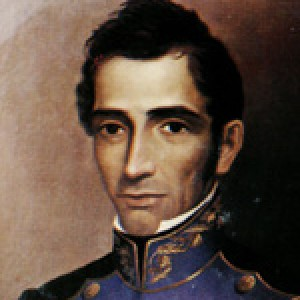

Governor of Zacatecas
- In office 1 January 1829 – 31 December 1834
- Vice Governor: Valentín Gómez Farías

Minister of Finances
- In office 2 November 1827 – 15 February 1828
- President: Guadalupe Victoria
- Preceded by: Tomás Salgado
- Succeeded by: José Ignacio Pavón

Senator for Zacatecas
- In office 1 January 1825 – 1826

Personal details
- Born: 20 November 1786 New Spain
- Died: 2 December 1841 (aged 55) Mexico

Francisco García Salinas (20 November 1786 – 2 December 1841), known as "Tata Pachito" was born in Jerez, Zacatecas, New Spain. He was a Mexican politician, Deputy and Senator, noted for his participation in the Second Mexican Constituent Congress. He was Minister of Finance (1827–1828) and Governor of Zacatecas, where he promoted important reforms.

== Early life ==
He was born on a country estate called 'the Labour of St. Gertrude' in the town of Jerez de García Salinas. Among other positions he was a Deputy and Senator of the Republic. In 1828 he was elected Governor of the State of Zacatecas. At the time García Salinas was president there were bitter disputes between those who sought to establish a central state and those seeking a federal system, including Salinas.

=== Studies ===
He joined the Apostolic College of San Francisco, and later the Seminary of Guadalajara, studying Latin, Philosophy and Scholastic Theology and at the same time subjects such as Mathematics, Geography and Literature. Upon completion of these studies he returned to his hometown.

== Personal life ==
He first married Señora Loreto Elías and later married Doña Maria Mercedes Dávila. He worked in the mines of Vetagrande and at the famous Quebradilla Mine. He acquired knowledge and extensive experience in this industry as well as carrying out research in this branch of mining.

== Public career ==
=== National politics ===
In 1821 he was appointed Registrar of Finances in the local government where he increased his popularity with the people. He was elected to the Mexican Constitutional Congress in 1823 and elected senator in 1824. In both the Lower house and the Upper House he managed the branch of public finance and was the author of the investments system in Mexico. While in the Senate he discovered many financial administrative irregularities. Upon assuming the Presidency of the Republic, General Guadalupe Victoria appointed García Salinas Minister of Finance. After only days in this post he determined to create a rigorous financial system to replace the chaos he encountered.

=== Return to Zacatecas ===
In 1828, he campaigned to complete the period of government of Jose Maria García Rojas. He dedicated himself to improving his "loyal lady", Zacatecas, winning the honorific, "Model Governor". The first thing García Salinas did was to create police forces to hunt down bandits and organize the National Guard to fight them. As a consequence of the end of Spanish rule, some mines were abandoned, so the government formed three companies to reopen them. The work began on the mines of Bolsas in Zacatecas, on the San Nicolas mines in Sombrerete, Villa Hidalgo in Santa Rita and Nochistlán de Mejía and La Palmita in Nieves. In late 1829 he unsuccessfully attempted to establish a bank for agriculture.

==== Agriculture ====
He acquired land and gave it to farmers who organized into military colonies. The government allocated funds to buy drills and sink artesian wells. He developed a textile industry for which he brought in master workers and officers and installed looms in Jerez, Villanueva and Aguascalientes, to take advantage of the available wool. He worked to improve the breeding of sheep and brought about cotton cultivation and the introduction and promotion of silkworms.

==== Education ====
García Salinas gave lectures in grammar, Latin, philosophy and canon law. This was the beginning of the Literary Institute of García Salinas in Zacatecas (now the Autonomous University of Zacatecas). He commissioned drawing academies in Zacatecas and Aguascalientes.

He established a Teachers' Training School, enabled a Primary Education Act (1831) and by 1832 established the state's first library. He acquired bibliographic material and subscriptions to newspapers and publications from Paris, London, New Orleans and South America.

==== Health ====
García Salinas fought epidemics of cholera and gastroenteritis that afflicted the country and which killed over 12,000 people. As a consequence he built the Panteón del Refugio, a large cemetery, which opened on 1 November 1834. More than 40,000 children were vaccinated against smallpox.

==== Construction ====
On 1 December 1832, the first theater was built on the ruins of the old prison. It was shaped like a horseshoe, with a capacity of 200 spectators. It caught fire on 8 October 1889. García Salinas established an armory on the site of the old convent of San Francisco, which in 1834 was moved to the citadel on the site of what is today the General Enrique Estrada School, (Esquelas de General Enrique Estradas).

=== Political exit ===
In 1832 supporters of General Manuel Gómez Pedraza faced the forces of Anastasio Bustamante and suffered a defeat in Llano Gallinero. This defeat ended Salinas Garcia's career as a governor.

== Death ==
He died on the Estate of San Pedro Piedra Gorda in the town of Cuauhtémoc, Zacatecas, on 2 December 1841, the victim of a lung condition during the same year that he was offered the Treasury Portfolio in Santa Anna's cabinet, which he did not accept.

In honour of Francisco García Salinas, the city of Jerez and the Autonomous University of Zacatecas took his name, as well as elementary, middle and high schools throughout the state.
