= Independence Day (Mexico) =

Public holiday in Mexico

Independence Day of Mexico
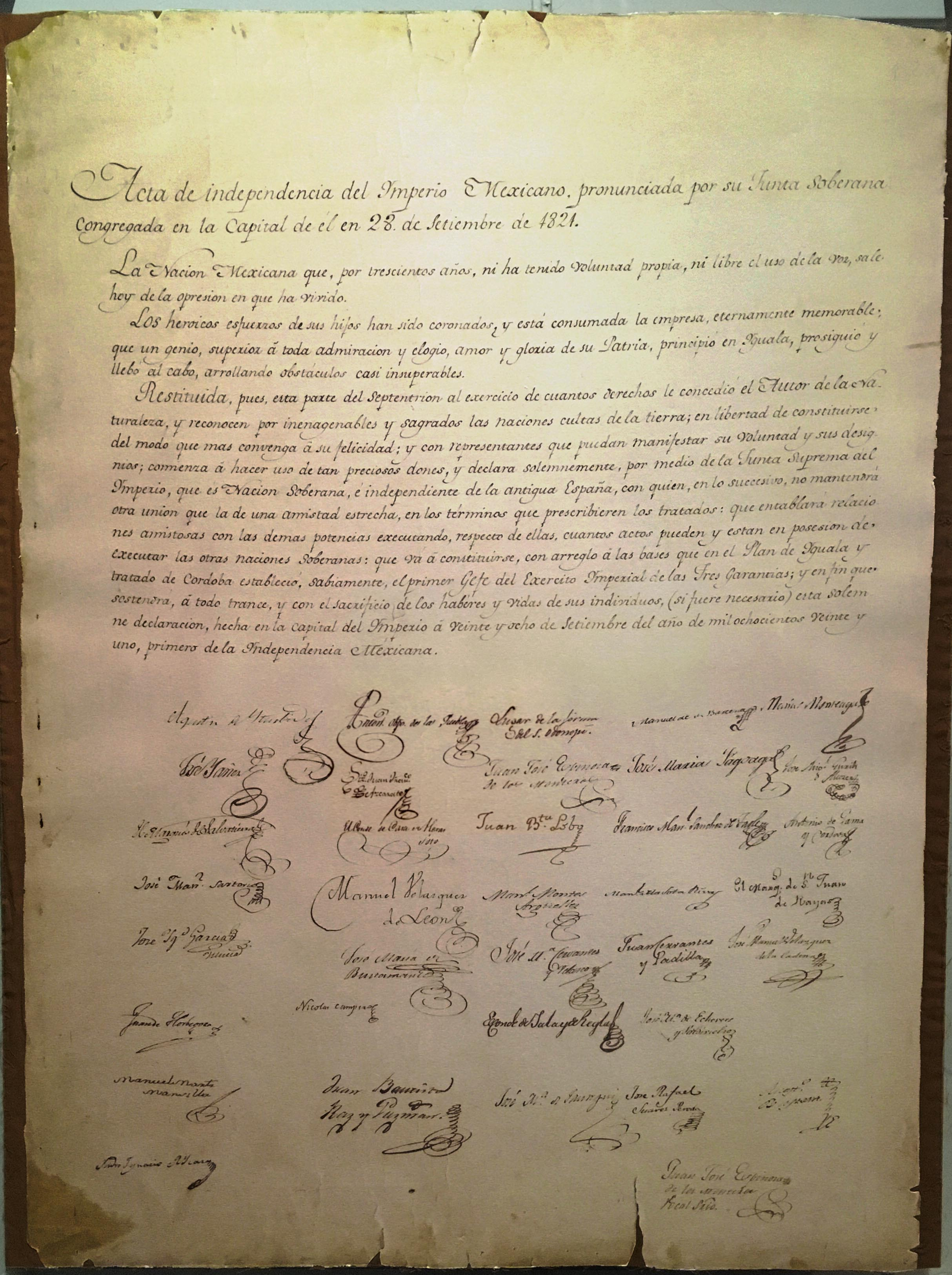
- Act of Independence
- Type: National
- Date: 16 September
- Frequency: Annual

Independence Day of Mexico (Spanish: Día de la Independencia de México) is celebrated on 16 September, although the main celebrations, such as Cry of Dolores ("El Grito de Dolores") take place on the evening of 15 September. This date marks the beginning of the Mexican War of Independence in 1810, when Miguel Hidalgo y Costilla called for rebellion against the Spanish Empire. It was given the status of a national holiday in the Constitution of Apatzingán, ratified by the conventions of 1822 and 1824, and first celebrated nationally in 1825.

The holiday is celebrated throughout the country with patriotic celebrations, music, food, and the traditional Grito at the National Palace.

== Background ==
On 27 September 1821, the Army of the Three Guarantees, led by Agustín de Iturbide, entered Mexico City, thus concluding the Mexican War of Independence. On 28 September, Iturbide installed the Supreme Provisional Government Junta, composed of 38 people and presided over by Antonio Pérez Martínez Robles, Bishop of Puebla de los Ángeles, and Juan José Espinosa de los Monteros and José Rafael Suárez Pereda as secretaries. The junta immediately proceeded to elect the five members of the Regency of the Empire. The Regency was composed of Iturbide, who would preside, Juan O'Donoju, Manuel de la Bárcena, José Isidro Yáñez, and Manuel Velázquez de León.

On 13 October of the same year, the first Political Leader of Mexico City, Ramón Gutiérrez del Mazo, ordered the publication of the proclamation with the Act of Independence for the first time so that the entire population would be aware of the great event, especially the Courts, Chiefs, Governors and other civil and military authorities, so that they in turn would have them published and circulated throughout the nation.

== Content ==
On the afternoon of 28 September, the members of the Junta met at the National Palace to draft the Declaration of Independence of the newly independent nation.

English translation:

Act of Independence of the Mexican Empire, pronounced by the Sovereign Junta assembled in the Capital on September 28, 1821.

The Mexican Nation, which for three hundred years has had neither its own will nor free use of its voice, emerges today from the oppression under which it has lived.

The heroic efforts of its children have been crowned, and the eternally memorable enterprise is accomplished, which a genius, surpassing all admiration and praise, for the love and glory of his homeland, began in Iguala, continued, and carried to completion, overcoming almost insurmountable obstacles.

This part of the North, therefore, restored to the exercise of all the rights granted to it by the Author of Nature and recognized as inalienable and sacred by the cultured nations of the earth; free to constitute itself in the manner most conducive to its happiness; and with representatives who can express its will and designs; begins to make use of such precious gifts, and solemnly declares, through the Supreme Junta of the Empire, that it is a sovereign nation, independent of the former Spain, with whom, henceforth, it will maintain no union other than that of a close friendship, under the terms prescribed by treaties; that it will establish friendly relations with the other powers and carry out whatever acts the other sovereign nations can and are in a position to permit; that it will be constituted, in accordance with the bases that the First Chief of the Imperial Army of the Three Guarantees wisely established in the Plan of Iguala and the Treaty of Córdoba; and finally, that it will uphold, at all costs, and with the sacrifice of the assets and lives of its individuals (if necessary) this solemn declaration, made in the capital of the Empire on September 28, 1821, the first year of Mexican Independence.

== National holiday ==
The Cry of Dolores has assumed an almost mythical status. Since the late 20th century, the event has come to symbolize Mexican independence and to initiate Independence Day ceremonies the following day (16 September). Independence Day in Mexico is a patriotic holiday marked by parades, concerts, patriotic programs, drum and bugle and marching band competitions, and special programs on national and local media outlets.

=== Presidential celebration at Mexico City ===
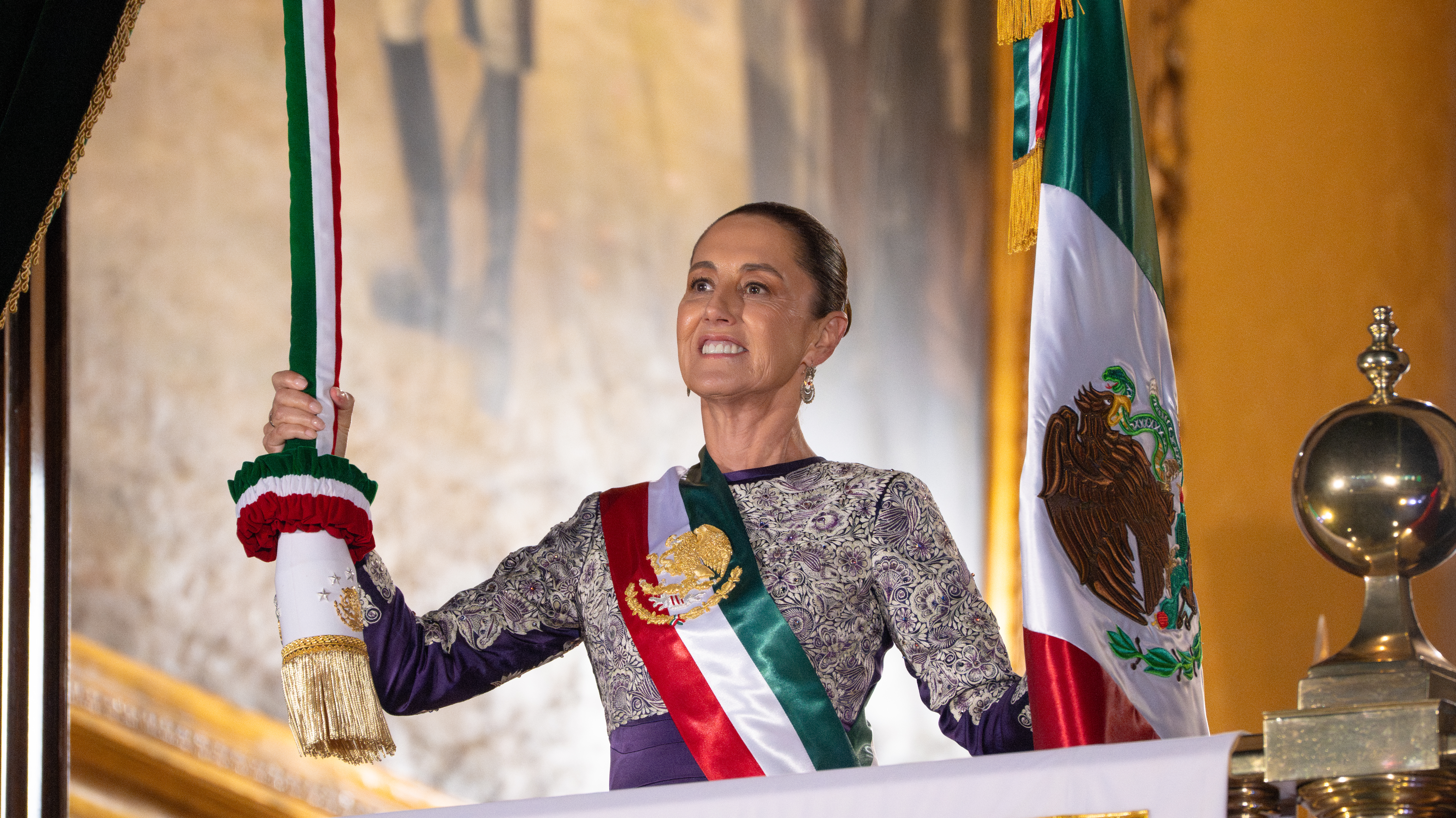
President Claudia Sheinbaum at the National Palace balcony during the Grito in Mexico City, 15 September 2025

Video of the ceremony in 2022

Every 15 September at around 11 p.m., the president of Mexico stands on the balcony of the National Palace in Mexico City and rings the same bell Hidalgo rang in 1810, which was moved to the National Palace. The president then recites a shout of patriotism (a Grito Mexicano) based upon the "Grito de Dolores", with the names of the important heroes of the Mexican War of Independence who were there on that historic day. The Grito ends with the threefold shout of ¡Viva México!

The Grito often differs slightly from year to year to reflect recent sentiments or a preference by the president for a shorter or longer shout. This is the version usually recited by the president of Mexico:

Mexicans!
Long live the heroes who gave us our homeland!
Long live Hidalgo!
Long live Morelos!
Long live Josefa Ortiz de Domínguez!
Long live Allende!
Long live Aldama and Matamoros!
Long live the nation's independence!
Long live Mexico! Long live Mexico! Long live Mexico!

Beneath the balcony of the National Palace, there is a large crowd in the Plaza de la Constitución (also called the Zócalo) to hear the recitation. The event draws up to half a million spectators from all over Mexico and tourists worldwide. After the president recites each line beginning with "¡Viva(n)!", the crowd responds by repeating, "¡Viva(n)!"

After the recitation, the president rings the bell and waves the flag of Mexico to the crowd's applause.

This is followed by the playing of the Mexican national anthem by a military band from the Mexican Armed Forces, with the crowd singing along. The ceremonies conclude with a spectacular fireworks display at the Zócalo grounds which are fired along traditional mexican music. In more recent years, projection mapping has also been used over the National Palace as well as over the facade of the Cathedral.

On the morning of 16 September, or Independence Day, the national military parade in honor of the holiday starts in the Zócalo and its outskirts, passes the Hidalgo Memorial, and ends on the Paseo de la Reforma, Mexico City's main boulevard, passing the "Ángel de la Independencia" memorial column and other places along the way.

=== Recent exceptions ===
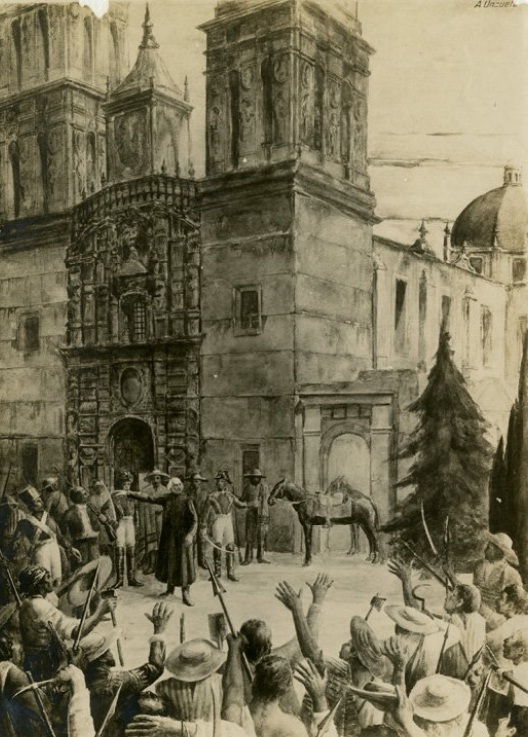
Grito de Dolores, 16 September 1810

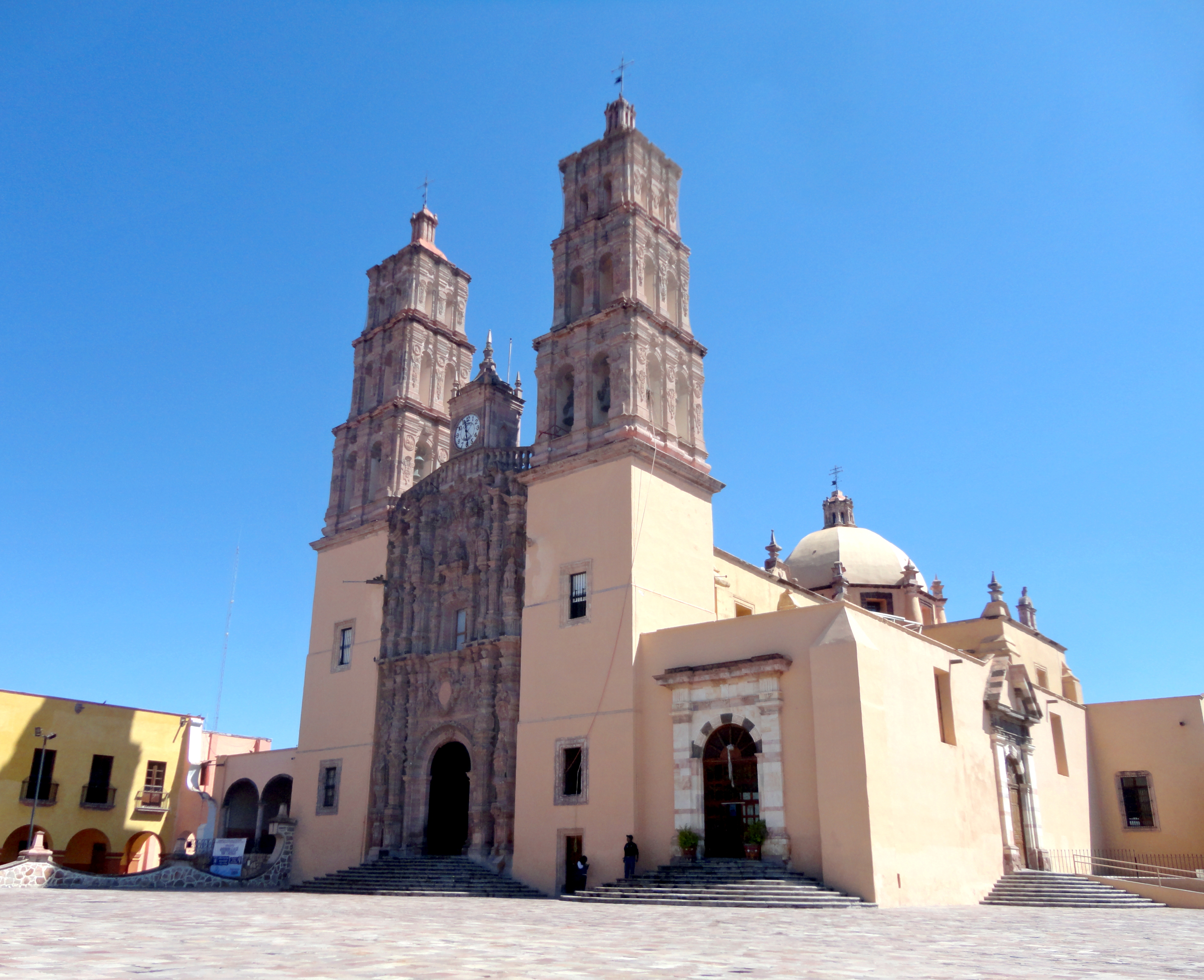
Our Lady of Sorrows Parish in Dolores Hidalgo, Guanajuato, Mexico

The Grito is not always re-enacted at the National Palace; some years, it is performed in Dolores Hidalgo, Guanajuato, where it originally happened. This is especially common in the final year of a president's term.

President Felipe Calderón made an exception by re-enacting the Grito in Dolores Hidalgo as part of the bicentennial celebrations on 16 September 2010, even though he had already done so the night before from the National Palace balcony to launch the celebrations. As a result, in 2012, Calderón's final year as president, he did not go to Dolores Hidalgo but gave the Grito from the National Palace balcony instead. President Enrique Peña Nieto did not perform the Grito in Dolores Hidalgo in his six years as president, becoming the fourth president to break the tradition.

Many presidents add their "personal touch" to the Grito, and this can be controversial. President Vicente Fox frequently took liberties with it, adding and removing items, addressing Mexicans of both genders, and wishing long life to "our agreements" in 2001. Peña Nieto gave "vivas" to victims of earthquakes in 2017.

During Peña Nieto's presidency, the Grito became an occasion for political protest against him and his Institutional Revolutionary Party (PRI). On 15 September 2016, thousands of citizens marched, yelled, and carried signs. They tried to enter the Zócalo during the Grito but were blocked by a wall of soldiers. News outlets within Mexico failed to acknowledge the protest. The event was well-attended, but opponents charged that the PRI brought acarreados (poor people or hand-picked party members) as a fake show of support.

The Grito was also disrupted in 2006 by a demonstration called the plantón. Crowds loyal to losing candidate Andrés Manuel López Obrador protested alleged irregularities in the just-concluded general election, and the Grito could not be delivered at the Zócalo but was spoken at the National Palace. López Obrador won the presidency in 2018.

In 2020, the COVID-19 pandemic caused the Grito to be done remotely.

=== The Grito by governors and municipal presidents ===
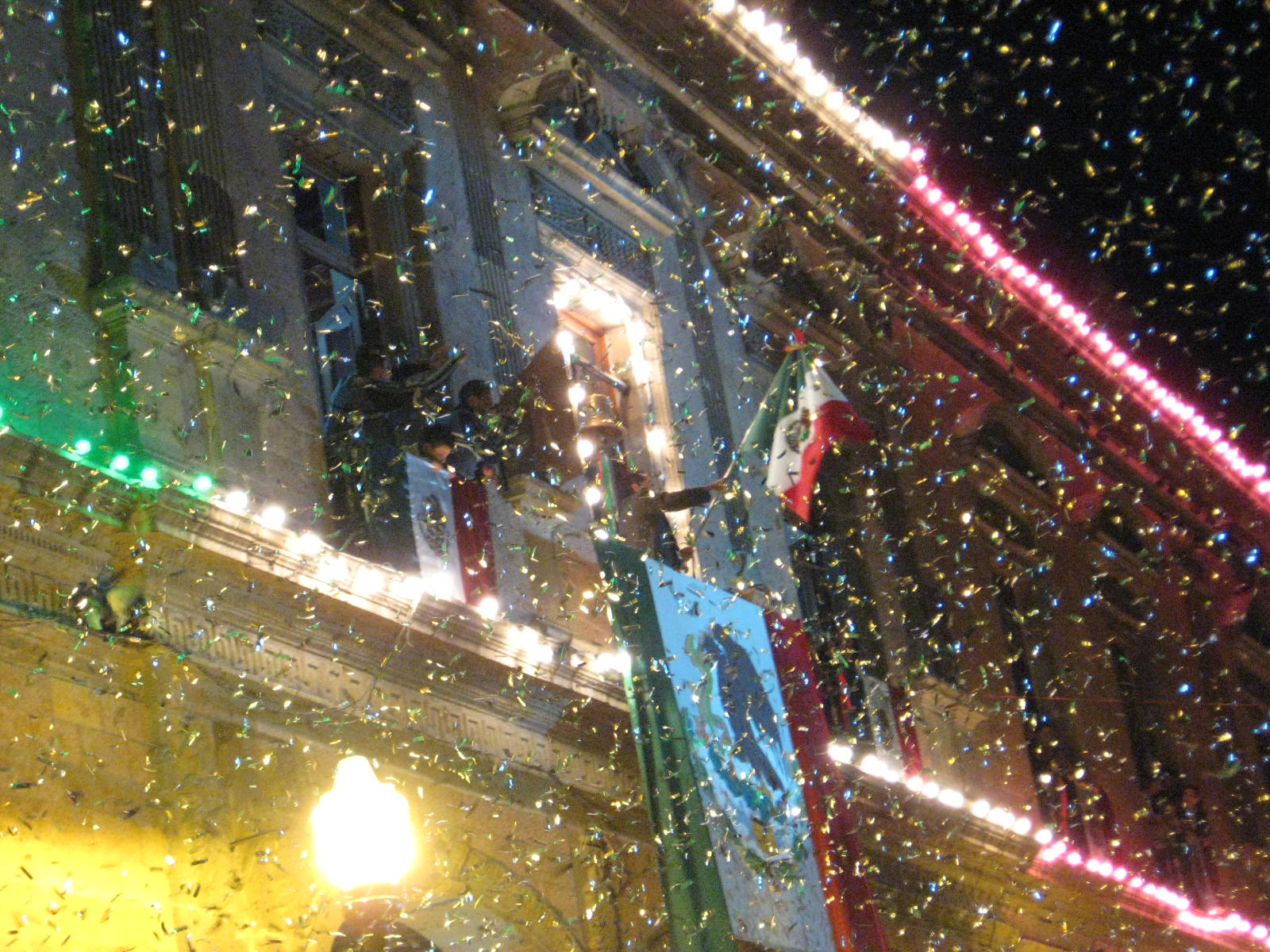
Municipal president giving the grito of "¡Viva México!" at the commencement of Independence Day festivities at 11 p.m. on 16 September 2008 in Ixmiquilpan, Hidalgo

Similar celebrations to the presidential one occur in cities and towns throughout Mexico, as well as Mexican embassies and consulates worldwide on 15 or 16 September. The chief executive, ambassador, or consul rings a bell and recites the traditional words, including the names of independence heroes and local patriots, and ends with the threefold shout of ¡Viva México! The bell rings again, the Mexican flag is waved, and everyone sings the National Anthem, followed by fireworks. There are also celebrations in schools throughout Mexico, and in these cases, whenever the bell ringing is reenacted, the school or university head utters the traditional words. Celebrations also take place outside of Mexico, such as in U.S. states that have a large concentration of people of Mexican heritage who celebrate the holiday.

== Confusion regarding Cinco de Mayo ==
Contrary to common misconception in the U.S., Cinco de Mayo is not Mexico's "Independence Day", but rather commemorates the victory of Mexican Republican forces over French forces in the first Battle of Puebla on 5 May 1862. In the battle fought there the following year the French forces were the victor.

In contrast to Independence Day, described above, Cinco de Mayo is observed mostly at a local level in Puebla State and is a minor Bank Holiday in the rest of Mexico. Many labor unions have negotiated to have the day off, however, since its proximity to Labor Day (1 May) often allows an extended five-day weekend or two consecutive three-day weekends. The first observance of Cinco de Mayo was in Los Angeles, California, in 1863. The observance sought to boost the spirits of American and Mexican residents during the dark days of the American Civil War and the Franco-Mexican War. Puebla would not hold its own celebrations until after the French were driven out of the city a few years later.

== See also ==
- Fiestas Patrias
