= Regency of the Mexican Empire =

Government seal of the Mexican Empire

The Regency of the Mexican Empire was a period of transition in the history of the Mexican monarchy in the absence of the Emperor of Mexico and presided by a president of the same during the First Mexican Empire (1821–1823) and the Second Mexican Empire (1863–1867). The regency is the government of a State during the minor age, absence or incapacity of its legitimate prince.

== First Regency ==
After the entry of the Trigarante Army, or the Army of the Three Guarantees on September 27, 1821, the viceregal government was dissolved and the Independence of Mexico was consumed, so on September 28, 1821, a Provisional Government Junta was installed, whose members took the oath and decreed the Act of Independence to confirm the freedom and sovereignty of Mexico. Agustín de Iturbide was unanimously elected as President of the Junta.

The Junta constituted the Regency of the Mexican Empire in the night session of September 28, 1821 with 5 members, which would exercise the Executive Power, selecting Iturbide as president, and secretaries to Juan O'Donojú (replaced by Antonio Joaquín Pérez Martínez on 8 of October when he died), Manuel de la Bárcena, José Isidro Yañez and Manuel Velázquez de León, who had been secretary of the viceroyalty. Once the Junta realized that Agustín de Iturbide had been also elected president in the Regency, Antonio Joaquín Pérez Martínez, the Bishop of Puebla was elected as the new president of the Junta, so then the "Executive Power" resided in the Regency and the "Legislative Power" in the Provisional Government Junta until the formation of a Constituent Congress. The Plan of Iguala stipulated a monarchical-constitutional government by a Congress. On the night of May 18, 1822, by popular acclamation, he reached the doors of the Iturbide house, now known as the Palace of Iturbide in Mexico City, to ask him to take the throne.

On May 19, 1822 the Congress met, where Agustín de Iturbide said that he would be subject to what the deputies, representatives of the people, decided, while the people cheered. The deputies Alcocer, Gutiérrez, Ansorena, Terán, Rivas, San Martín and others, faced the popular excitement trying that at least, the pronouncement was legalized by means of a plebiscite. The deputy Valentín Gómez Farías, supported by 46 deputies, said that once the Treaty of Córdoba and the Plan of Iguala had been broken - since they had not been accepted in Spain - it was up to the deputies to cast their vote for Iturbide to be declared Emperor of Mexico. Gómez Farías added that he should be obliged to obey the Constitution, laws, orders and decrees issued by the Mexican Congress. The deputies began to debate in the midst of shouts and interruptions, then, proceeded to the vote. Iturbide was elected by 67 votes against 15. The crowd cheered the result and accompanied the generalissimo cheering him from Congress to his residence. By popular desire and by legitimate decision of the Congress, Agustin de Iturbide was proclaimed Constitutional Emperor of Mexico as Agustín I of Mexico.

The principal objectives of the Plan of Iguala were called "the Three Guarantees", and these were: "independence, union and religion of all races of the nation". A new army, called the Trigarante Army, would be in charge of carrying out this plan and would be identified with a new flag. The Plan of Iguala was an act of political agreement, intensely complex in its consequences, although simple in its phrasing, which united conservatives and liberals, rebels and realists, and Creoles and Spaniards. It consisted of 23 articles, and it had something for everyone: article 1, for example, declared that the religion of the nation would be the Roman Apostolic catholic, without tolerance of other religion. Article 2, the independence of the nation and Article 3, advocated the establishment of a Mexican monarchy regulated by a constitution.

=== First Council of the Regency (1821–1822) ===
- Agustín de Iturbide, President (September 28, 1821 – April 11, 1822)
- Juan O'Donojú (September 28, 1821 – October 8, 1821) replaced after his death by Antonio Pérez Martínez y Robles (October 9, 1821 – April 11, 1822)
- Manuel de la Bárcena (September 28, 1821 – April 11, 1822)
- José Isidro Yañez y Nuño (September 28, 1821 – April 11, 1822)
- Manuel Velázquez de León y Pérez (September 28, 1821 – April 11, 1822)

=== Second Council of the Regency (1822–1822) ===
- Agustín de Iturbide, President (April 11, 1822 – May 18, 1822)
- José Isidro Yañez y Nuño (April 11, 1822 – May 18, 1822)
- Miguel Valentín y Tamayo (April 11, 1822 – May 18, 1822)
- Manuel de Heras Soto (April 11, 1822 – May 18, 1822)
- Nicolás Bravo (April 11, 1822 – May 18, 1822)

== Second Regency ==
At the end of the War of Reform, President Benito Juárez decreed the suspension of all public debts on July 17, 1861 and annul any possible payment such as the Mon-Almonte Treaty, promulgated in Paris between Alejandro Mon and Juan Nepomuceno Almonte for the ratification by monetary payments to delayed debts of Spain and by the murders of Spaniards in San Vicente and San Dimas, including those contracted with the foreign nations, being a very remarkable fact, because it was the determining cause of the arrival in Mexico of the representatives from England, France and Spain, with their respective armies to demand the payment of their respective debts, for this reason, 51 deputies asked for the resignation of Benito Juárez as president and to promote Jesús González Ortega as the new President of Mexico, but another 54 deputies asked Benito Juarez not to resign, while the War and Foreign Secretaries of Benito Juárez dismissed all the conservatives abroad on behalf of the Mexican legation just after President Miguel Miramón and his secretaries traveled to Europe to meet with the French emperor Napoleon III, among the delegates dismissed by Benito Juárez were Juan Nepomuceno Almonte and José Manuel Hidalgo.

Meanwhile, England and France broke relations with the liberal Mexican government of Benito Juárez, while the conservative Mexican government by José Manuel Hidalgo, Juan Nepomuceno Almonte and José María Gutiérrez de Estrada got the first steps to establish a monarchy in Mexico with Maximilian of Habsburg as Emperor of Mexico.

Juan Nepomuceno Almonte arrives in Spain to visit the Minister of Justice Fernando Calderón to inform him about the establishment of the monarchy in Mexico and the candidacy of Maximilian, so he arrived in France a few days later to visit Maximilian at his Castle of Miramar, where Maximilian entrusted activities for his return to Mexico on March 1, 1862, thus achieving the arrival of French ships and the immediate departure of Benito Juarez with his army and most of the Liberal residents of the capital of the Republic.

The Superior Government Junta was created on June 21, 1863 from the conservative governments parallel to the Benito Juárez Liberal Government, which appointed General Juan Nepomuceno Almonte, José Ignacio Pavón, José Mariano Salas and the "Executive Power" to the Archbishop of Mexico Pelagio Antonio de Labastida who, in less than two months, was dismissed from office because of the struggles he had with the French authorities and with Almonte who did not wait. The prelate manifested himself soon in his disagreements, especially his intention to prevent the ratification of the rights of sale of ecclesiastical property. This triumvirate assumed the role of the Regency of the Second Mexican Empire by decree on July 11, 1863.

=== Third Council of the Regency ===
- Juan Nepomuceno Almonte, President (July 11, 1863 – May 20, 1864)
- José Mariano Salas (July 11, 1863 – May 20, 1864)
- Pelagio Antonio de Labastida (July 11, 1863 – November 17, 1863) replaced by Juan Bautista de Ormaechea, Bishop of Tulancingo (November 17, 1863 – May 20, 1864)
- José Ignacio Pavón (July 11, 1863 – January 2, 1864) dismissed for disobeying the orders of the Regency in relation to the nationalization and confiscation of church property.

== See also ==
- Emperor of Mexico
- House of Iturbide
