= Provisional Government Junta =

Historical Mexican governing body

Provisional Government Junta Junta Provisional Gubernativa
- First Mexican Empire

Type
- Type: Unicameral

History
- Founded: 28 September 1821
- Disbanded: 24 February 1822
- Succeeded by: Constituent Congress

Leadership
- President: Agustín de Iturbide (1821)
- Seats: 38

Meeting place
- Mexico City

The Provisional Governing Junta was the first governing body of independent Mexico that administered the country from 28 September 1821, until 24 February 1822, when the First Mexican Congress was installed.

== Legal Basis ==
The Provisional Government Junta originated in virtue of two articles in the Plan of Iguala which established an independent Mexican state.

- Article VI. A Junta composed of the first men of the Empire for its virtues, for its destinies, for its fortunes, representation and concept, will be appointed immediately according to the spirit of the Plan of Iguala, from those who are designated by the general opinion, whose number is quite considerable for the meeting of lights to ensure the success in their determinations, which will be emanations from the authority and faculties granted to them by the following articles.
- Article VII. The Junta referred to in the previous article will be called Provisional Governing Junta.

== Administration ==
The Junta first met on the morning of 28 September 1821, being joined by former viceroy O'Donoju. Iturbide laid out an agenda, and pledged his loyalty and that of the army to obey the Junta's directions. The members of the junta then proceeded to the National Cathedral, each swore an oath to uphold the Plan of Iguala and the Treaty of Cordoba. In the afternoon, an official declaration of independence was issued, and a regency was formed to serve as the executive.

== List of presidents of the Junta ==
- Agustín de Iturbide (28 September 1821 – 4 October 1821)
- Antonio Joaquín Pérez Martínez (5 October 1821 – 12 October 1821)
- José Miguel Guridi y Alcocer (13 October 1821 – 24 February 1822)

== Members ==
1. Don Antonio Joaquín Pérez Martínez, bishop of the Puebla de los Ángeles.
2. Don Juan O'Donojú, lieutenant general of the Spanish armies.
3. Don José Mariano de Almanza, State Councilor.
4. Don Manuel de la Bárcena, archdeacon of the Holy Church Cathedral of Valladolid and governor of that bishopric.
5. Don Matías Monteagudo, rector of the National University, canon of the Metropolitan Cathedral of Mexico City and preposition of the Oratory of San Felipe Neri.
6. Don José Isidro Yáñez, judge of the Hearing of Mexico.
7. Don Juan Francisco Azcárate y Lezama, lawyer of the Audience of Mexico and Second Syndic of the Constitutional City Council.
8. Don Juan José Espinosa de los Monteros, lawyer of the Audience of Mexico and fiscal agent of the civil thing.
9. Don José María Fagoaga, honorary judge of the Hearing of Mexico.
10. Don Miguel Guridi y Alcocer, priest of the Metropolitan Cathedral of Mexico City.
11. Don Francisco Severo Maldonado, priest of Mascota, in the Archdiocese of Guadalajara.
12. Don Miguel Jerónimo de Cervantes y Velasco, Marquis de Salvatierra and Knight Maestrante de Ronda.
13. Don Manuel de Heras Soto, Count of Casa de Heras, retired lieutenant colonel.
14. Don Juan Lobo, merchant, old regidor of the city of Veracruz.
15. Don Francisco Manuel Sánchez de Tagle
16. Don Antonio Gama, lawyer of the Hearing and senior schoolboy of Santa María de Todos los Santos de México.
17. Don José Manuel Sartorio, bachelor priest clergyman of the Archdiocese.
18. Don Manuel Velázquez de León, secretary who had been of the viceroyalty, honorary mayor of the province, treasurer of bulls, appointed in Spain director of public finance in Mexico and State councilor.
19. Manuel Montes Argüelles, landowner of Orizaba.
20. Manuel Sotarriva, brigadier of the national armies, colonel of the infantry regiment of the Crown and knight of the Order of San Hermenegildo.
21. Jose Mariano Sandaneta, Marquis of San Juan de Rayas, Knight of the National Order of Carlos III and vowel of the Junta of censorship of freedom of the press.
22. Ignacio García Illueca, lawyer of the Audience of Mexico, retired sergeant major and substitute of the provincial deputation.
23. José Domingo Rus y Ortega de Azarraullía, judge of the Audience of Guadalajara, and minister of the Supreme Court of Justice of the Nation, Venezuela.
24. José María Bustamante, retired lieutenant colonel.
25. José María Cervantes y Velasco, retired colonel. Count of Santiago Calimaya, whose title yielded to his son don José Juan Cervantes, for being incompatible with other mayorazgos.
26. Juan María Cervantes y Padilla, retired colonel, uncle of the previous one.
27. José Manuel Velázquez de la Cadena, retired captain, lord of Villa de Yecla (Spain) and alderman of City of Mexico.
28. Juan Orbegozo, colonel of the national armies.
29. Nicolás Campero, retired lieutenant colonel.
30. Pedro José Romero de Terreros, Count of Jala y Regla, Marquis of San Cristóbal and of Villa Hermosa de Alfaro, gentleman of camera with entrance and captain of slaves of the guard of the Viceroy.
31. José María Echevers Valdivieso Vidal de Lorca, Marquis of San Miguel de Aguayo and Santa Olaya.
32. Manuel Martínez Mancilla, judge of the Audience of Mexico.
33. Juan B. Raz y Guzmán, lawyer and fiscal agent of the Audience of Mexico.
34. José María Jáuregui, lawyer of the Audience of Mexico.
35. Rafael Suárez Pereda, lawyer of the Audience of Mexico and judge of letters.
36. Anastasio Bustamante, colonel of Dragons' Army of San Luis.
37. Ignacio Icaza, who had been a Jesuit.
38. Manuel Sánchez Enciso.

== See also ==
- Regency of the Mexican Empire
