= Declaration of Independence (Mexico) =

1821 document

Declaration of Independence of the Mexican Empire
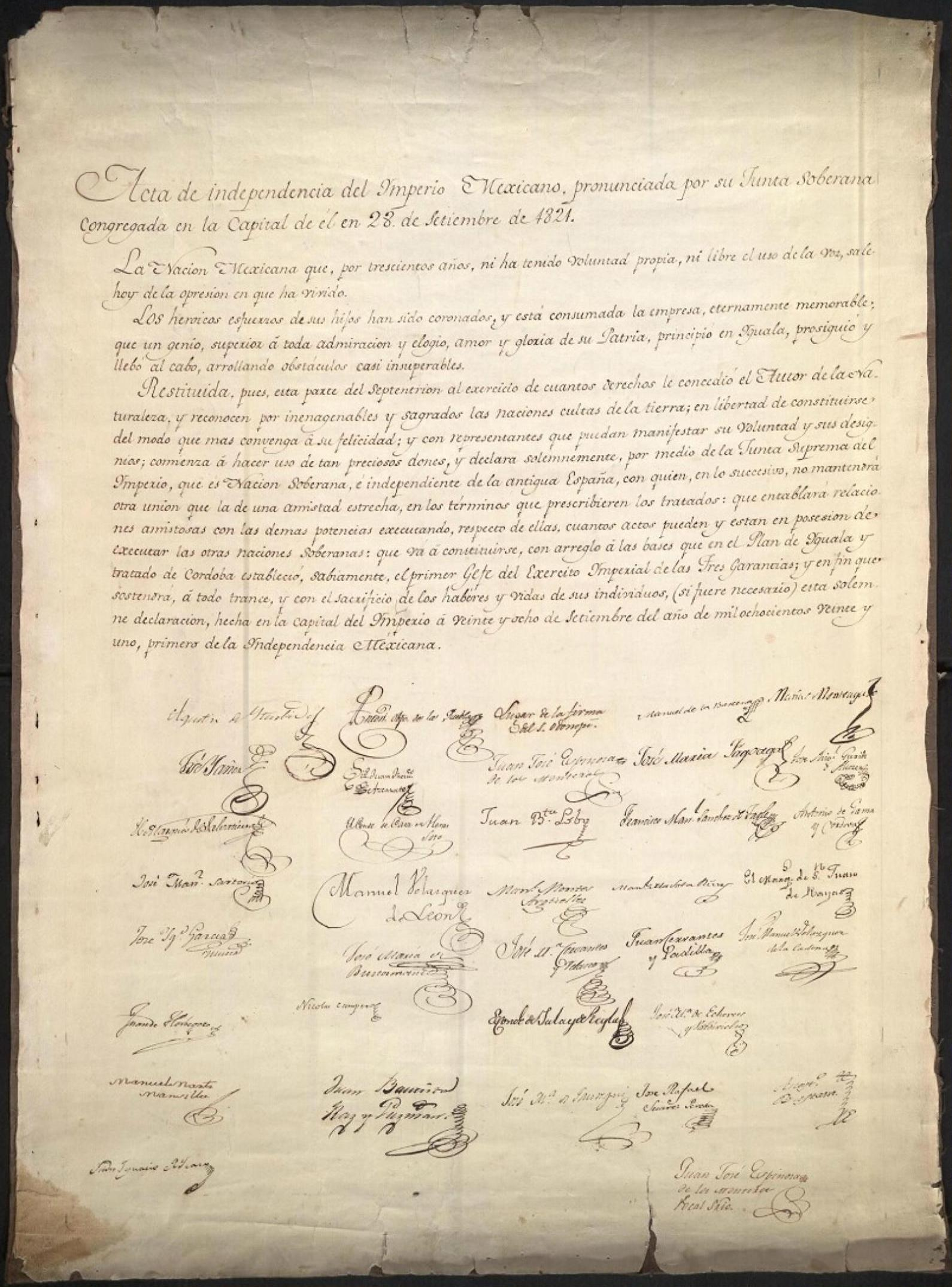
- Original copy of the Declaration
- Ratified: 28 September 1821
- Location: National Archives
- Author: Juan José Espinosa de los Monteros
- Signatories: 33 members of the board and Agustín de Iturbide
- Purpose: To announce and explain separation from Spain

The Declaration of Independence of the Mexican Empire (Spanish: Acta de Independencia del Imperio Mexicano) is the document by which Mexico declared independence from the Spanish Empire. This founding document of the Mexican nation was drafted in the National Palace in Mexico City on 28 September 1821, by Juan José Espinosa de los Monteros, secretary of the Provisional Governmental Board.

Three copies of the act were executed. One was destroyed in a fire in 1909. The other two copies are in the Museo Histórico de Acapulco Fuerte de San Diego in Acapulco and in the General Archive of the Nation in Mexico City.

The document is 52.9 centimeters (20.8 in) wide and 71.8 centimeters (28.3 in) high.

== Background ==
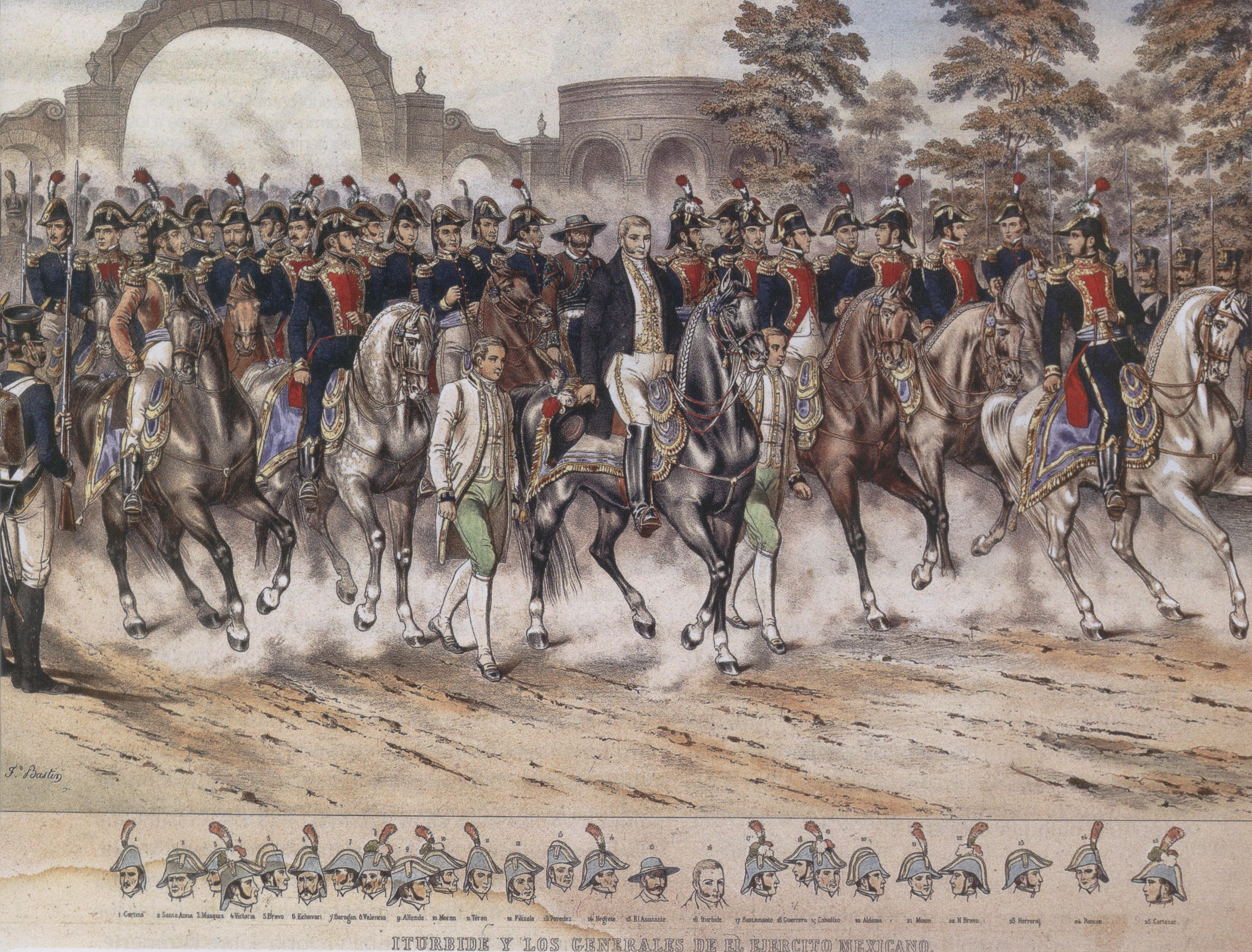
Entry of the Army of the Three Guarantees to México City

On 27 September 1821, eleven years and eleven days after the Grito de Dolores, the Army of the Three Guarantees headed by Agustín de Iturbide entered Mexico City, concluding the Mexican War of Independence. On 28 September, Iturbide installed the Provisional Governing Board, comprising 38 people. The board was chaired by Antonio Pérez Martínez y Robles, and Juan José Espinosa de los Monteros was secretary. The board immediately elected the five members of the Regency of the Empire.

On 13 October of the same year, Ramón Gutiérrez del Mazo, the first political chief of Mexico City, distributed a proclamation with the Declaration of Independence so all the people could read it, especially the courts, governors and military authorities, for them to publish it nationwide.

== Drafting and signing ==
On the afternoon of September 28, members of the Board met at the National Palace to draft the Declaration of Independence of the newly independent nation. The resulting two documents were drafted in its final form by Juan José Espinosa de los Monteros, Secretary of the Board. The acts were signed by 33 of the 38 members of the Board and Iturbide as President of the Regency of the Empire. Juan O'Donojú, last Superior Political Chief of New Spain, Francisco Severo Maldonado, José Domingo Rus, José Mariano de Almanza and Miguel Sánchez Enciso did not sign the documents, but in the acts was written: Place of signature Juan O'Donojú and later his signature was added in the printed copies. The signatures of other four members were not added. Juan Jose Espinosa de los Monteros signed twice in each act, once as a member of the Board and the second as secretary, so that the acts contain 35 signatures and the designated to O'Donojú. A copy of the act was for the government and one for the board, the last one was later sent to the Chamber of Deputies. None of the former insurgents—such as Guadalupe Victoria, Vicente Guerrero or Nicolás Bravo—signed the Declaration of Independence; the reason is unknown but possibly because they wanted a republic, not an empire.

== Text ==
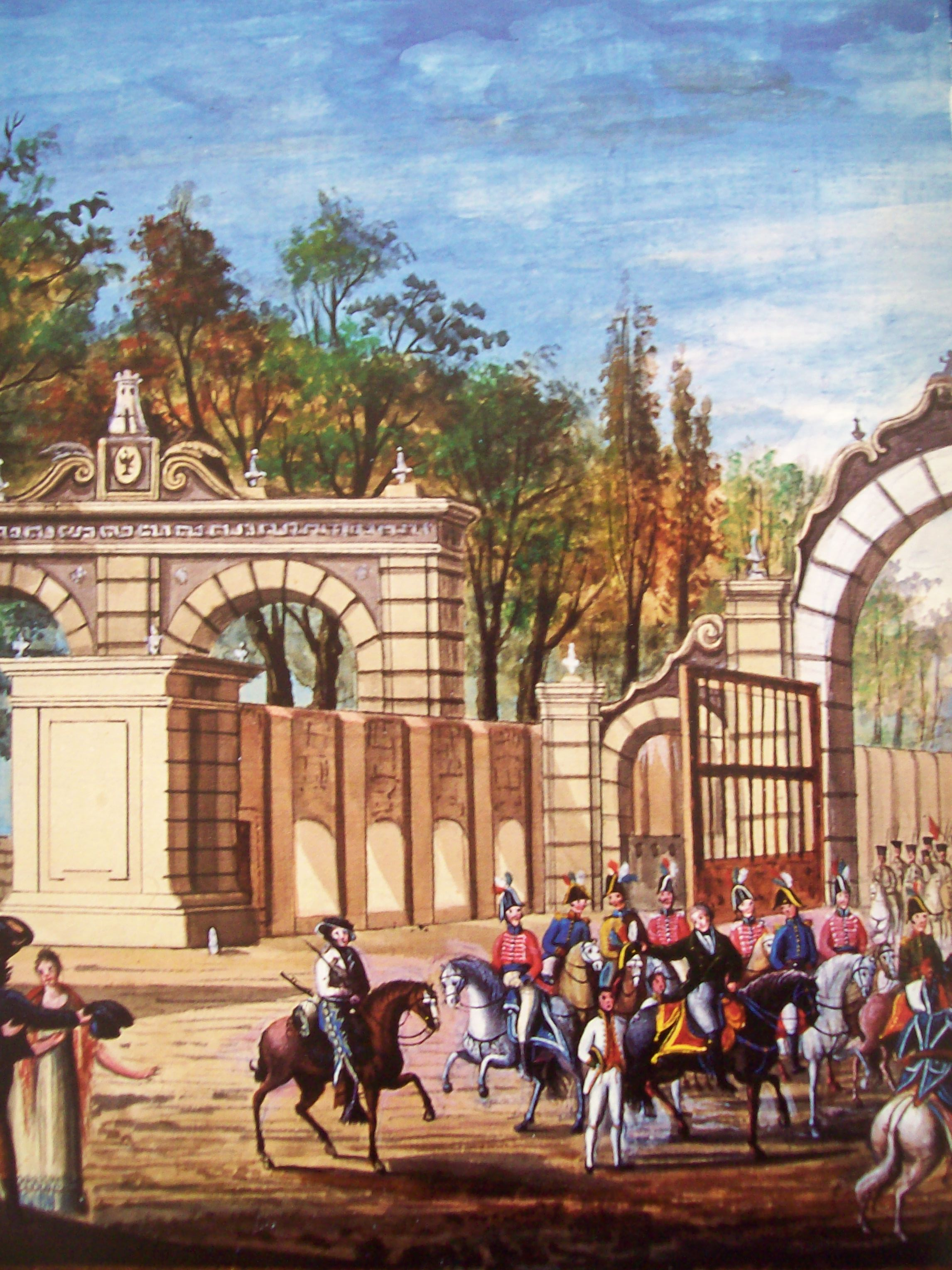
Entrance of the Trigarante Army by La Garita de Belén to Mexico City.

Declaration of the independence of the Mexican Empire, issued by its Sovereign Junta, assembled in the Capital on 28 September 1821.

The Mexican Nation, which for three hundred years had neither had its own will, nor free use of its voice, leaves today the oppression in which it has lived.

The heroic efforts of its sons have been crowned today, and consummated in an eternal and memorable enterprise, which a spirit superior to all admiration and praise, out of love and for the glory of its Country started in Iguala, continued, and brought to fruition, overcoming almost insurmountable obstacles.

Restored then this part of the North to the exercise of all the rights given by the Author of Nature and recognized as unalienable and sacred by the civilized nations of the Earth, in liberty to constitute itself in the manner which best suits its happiness and through representatives who can manifest its will and plans, it begins to make use of such precious gifts and solemnly declares by means of the Supreme Junta of the Empire that it is a Sovereign nation and independent of old Spain with which henceforth it will maintain no other union besides a close friendship in the terms prescribed by the treaties; that it will establish friendly relationships with other powers, executing regarding them whatever declarations the other sovereign nations can execute; that it will constitute itself in accordance to the bases which in the Plan of Iguala and the Treaty of Córdoba the First Chief of the Imperial Army of the Three Guarantees wisely established and which it will uphold at all costs and with all sacrifice of the means and lives of its members (if necessary); this solemn declaration, is made in the capital of the Empire on the twenty-eighth of September of the year one thousand eight hundred and twenty-one, first of Mexican Independence

Amen.

=== Signatories ===
The following is the list of the people who signed the Declaration of Independence, the names are written like in the acts. Juan O'Donoju did not sign but his name was written in the acts. Of the 38 members of the Provisional Governmental Board only 34 signed the document (including the aforementioned firm O'Donoju). The signatures of Francisco Severo Maldonado, José Domingo Rus, José Mariano de Almanza and Miguel Sánchez Enciso did not appear to have suffered a possible impairment due to illness.

- Agustín de Iturbide
- Antonio Obispo de Puebla
- Lugar de la firma de O'Donojú
- Manuel de la Bárcena
- Matías de Monteagudo
- José Yáñez
- Licenciado Juan Francisco Azcárate
- Juan José Espinosa de los Monteros
- José María Fagoaga
- José Miguel Guridi y Alcocer
- El Marqués de Salvatierra
- El Conde de Casa de Heras y Soto
- Juan Bautista Lobo
- Francisco Manuel Sánchez de Tagle
- Antonio de Gama y Córdoba
- José Manuel Sartorio
- Manuel Velázquez de León
- Manuel Montes Argüelles
- Manuel de la Sota Riva
- El Marqués de San Juan de Rayas
- José Ignacio García Illueca
- José María de Bustamante
- José María de Cervantes y Velasco
- Juan Cervantes y Padilla
- José Manuel Velázquez de la Cadena
- Juan Horbegoso
- Nicolás Campero
- El Conde de Jala y de Regla
- José María Echevers y Valdivieso
- Manuel Martínez Mancilla
- Juan Bautista Raz y Guzmán
- José María Jáuregui
- José Rafael Suárez Pereda
- Anastasio Bustamante
- Isidro Ignacio de Icaza
- Juan José Espinosa de los Monteros – Vocal Srio

=== Absent Signatories ===
- Juan O'Donojú
- Francisco Severo Maldonado
- José Domingo Rus y Ortega de Azarraullía
- Miguel Sánchez

== History of the three original documents ==
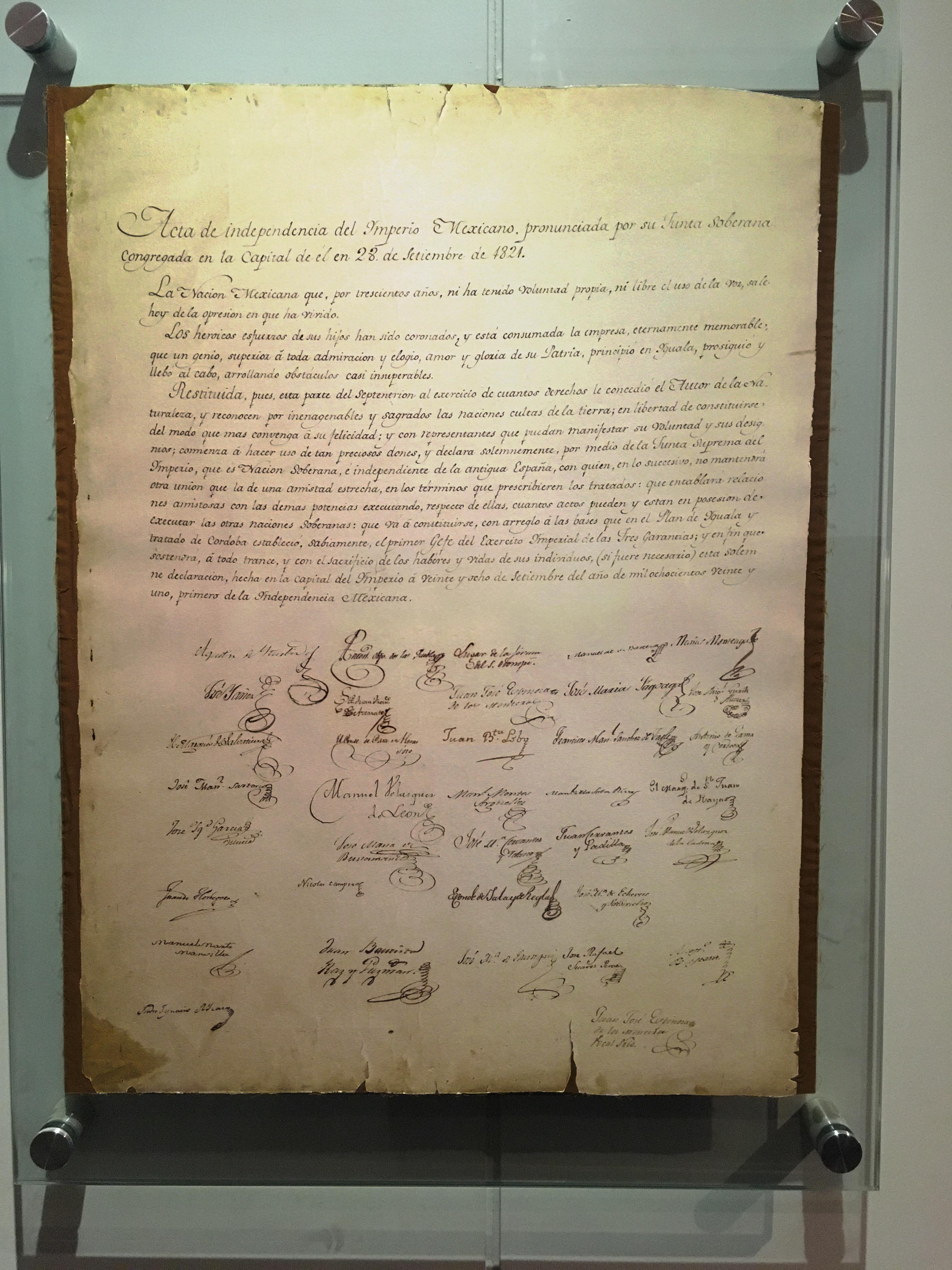
Mexico's declaration of Independence as an Empire drafted on September 28, 1821

Three originals of the document were created and signed.

=== Provisional Governmental Board – first original declaration ===
One copy was given to the Provisional Governmental Board, which was later put on display in the Chamber of Deputies until 1909, when fire destroyed the location.

=== Bravo/Ruiz de Velasco – second original declaration ===
The Ruiz de Velasco family were the original owners for 128 years of the Acta de Independencia del Imperio Mexicano de 1821. This document was passed down through generations from Nicolás Bravo. On 22 August 1987, Pedro Ruiz de Velasco de la Madrid gave the document as a gift to Mexico. José Francisco Ruiz Massieu, Governor of Guerrero, accepted this gift and secured this historical document in the Museo Historico de Acapulco Fuerte de San Diego in Acapulco in the State of Guerrero.

=== Regency of the Empire – third original declaration ===
A third copy was given to the Regency of the Empire, which remained at the National Palace and was stolen in 1830. Foreign Minister Lucas Alamán made this reference about the theft:

"There is not in the republic another copy (handwritten) that the one in session hall of the Chamber of Deputies, the other was sold by an unfaithful employee to a curious traveler from France."

Alamán wanted to get the record during his tenure as foreign minister but failed even when he offered a lot of money for it.

Decades later, the act was acquired by Emperor Maximilian I, although it is unknown how and where he got it. The act contains in the back the figure of the ex libris of Maximilian's library. After Maximilian's execution, Agustin Fischer, confessor of the emperor, took the document out of the country.

Some time later, the act appeared in Spain in the library of antiquarian Gabriel Sánchez. It is also unknown how he got it, but is a fact that the act has in the back the stamp of the Spanish antiquarian library. Sánchez sold the document to the Mexican historian Joaquín García Icazbalceta, who preserved it and passed it down to his son Luis García Pimentel.

Florencio Gavito Bustillo lived in France and there he was contacted by Luis García Pimentel, who offered to sell him the Declaration of Independence. After buying the act for 10 thousand pesos he returned to Mexico with the intention of delivering the act to the Mexican government himself, but he died of leukemia in 1958. Gavito expressed in his will the wish that the act should be delivered to the president.

The Mexican government sent the document for opinions of authenticity. The opinions were ready on November 14, 1961.

The ceremony to deliver the act was held on 21 November of the same year. Florencio Gavito Jauregui, son of Gavito Bustillo gave the act to the president Adolfo López Mateos. In the ceremony were also Gustavo Díaz Ordaz, Secretary of the Interior and Jaime Torres Bodet, Secretary of Education.

The act was put on display for a while in Chapultepec Castle and then it was withdrawn and sent to the General Archive of the Nation.

In 2008, the restoration works on the act began and it was exhibited for a month at the Palace of Lecumberri. In 2010 it was put on display at the National Palace as part of the celebration of the bicentennial of the beginning of Mexico's independence. The National Institute of Anthropology and History was concerned about the exposure of the act and recommended not to expose it to more time because it does not have a special system for that.

The act is protected between two flyleaves made with acid-free materials in the vault of the General Archive of the Nation under climate monitoring. Experts of the National Autonomous University of Mexico are working on a system of preservation and exhibition of historical documents in order to permanently exhibit the act in the near future.

== Gallery ==
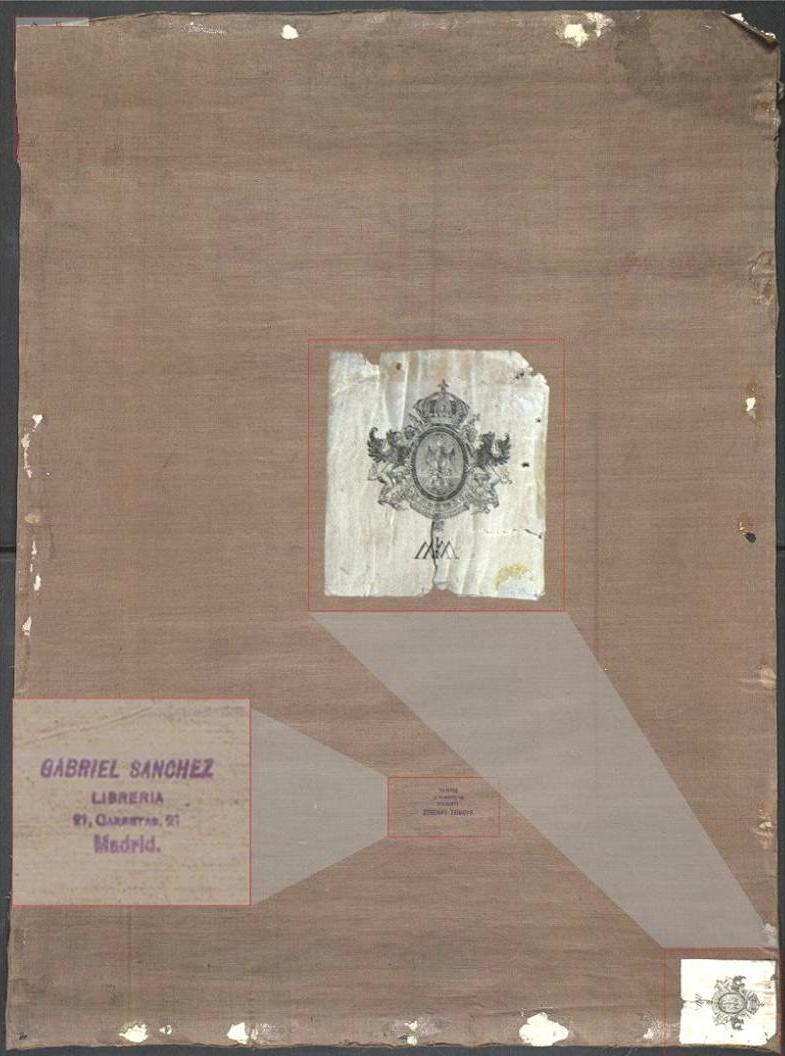
Rear of the act.

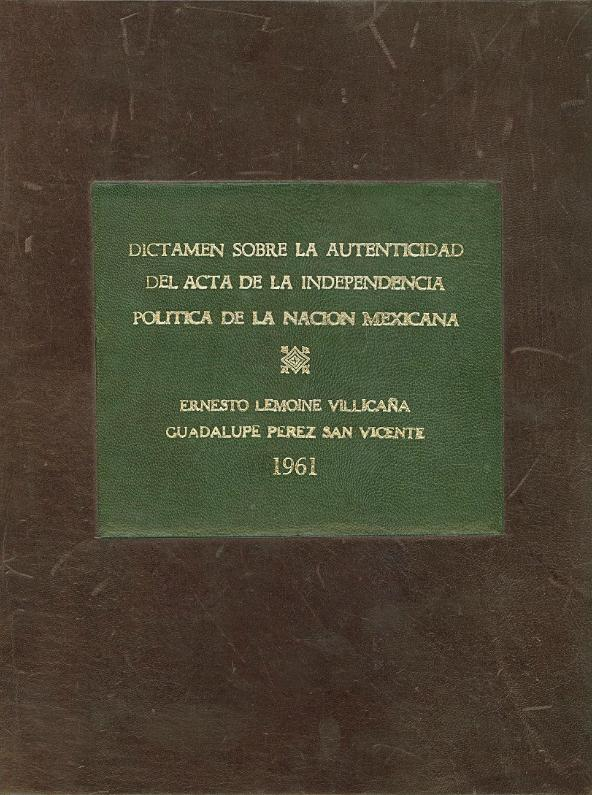
Cover of the certificate of authenticity of the act.

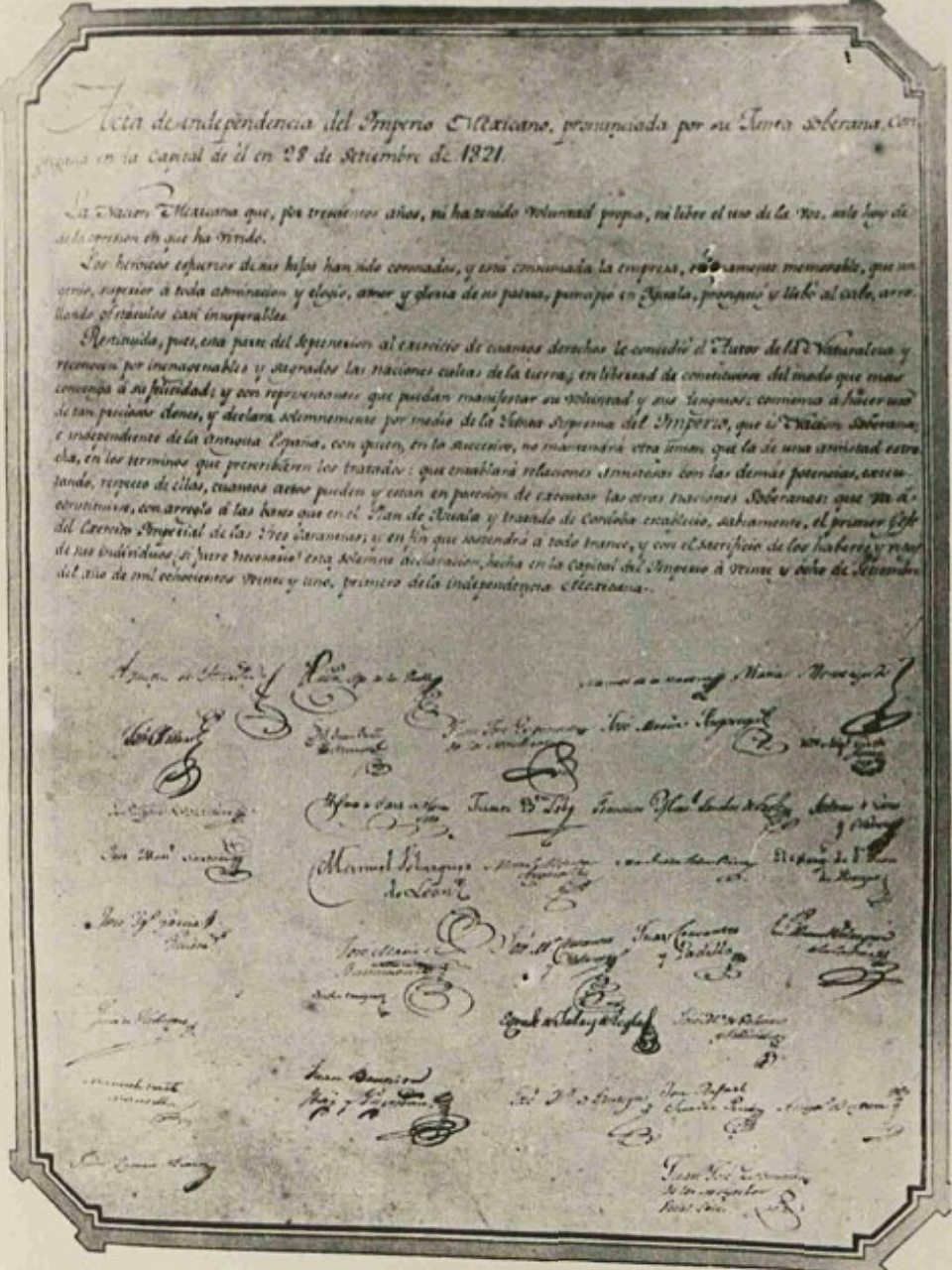
Photography of the destroyed act.

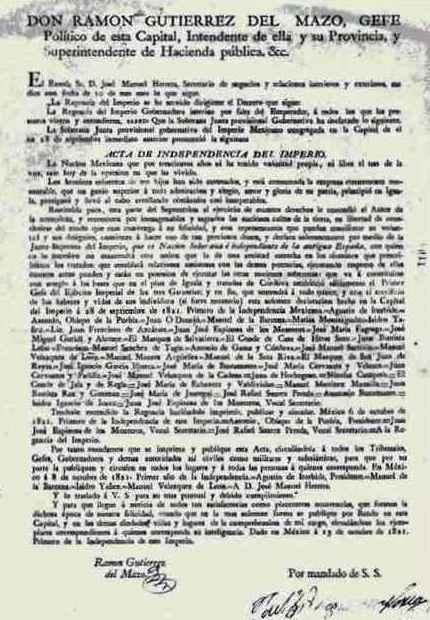
Proclamation with the text of the act.

== See also ==
- Act of Independence of Central America
- Solemn Act of the Declaration of Independence of Northern America

== Bibliography ==
- Vicente Riva Palacio (1880) México a través de los siglos Volume IV: "México Independiente". Mexico City, Cumbre.
