= McLane–Ocampo Treaty =

1859 treaty between the United States and Mexico

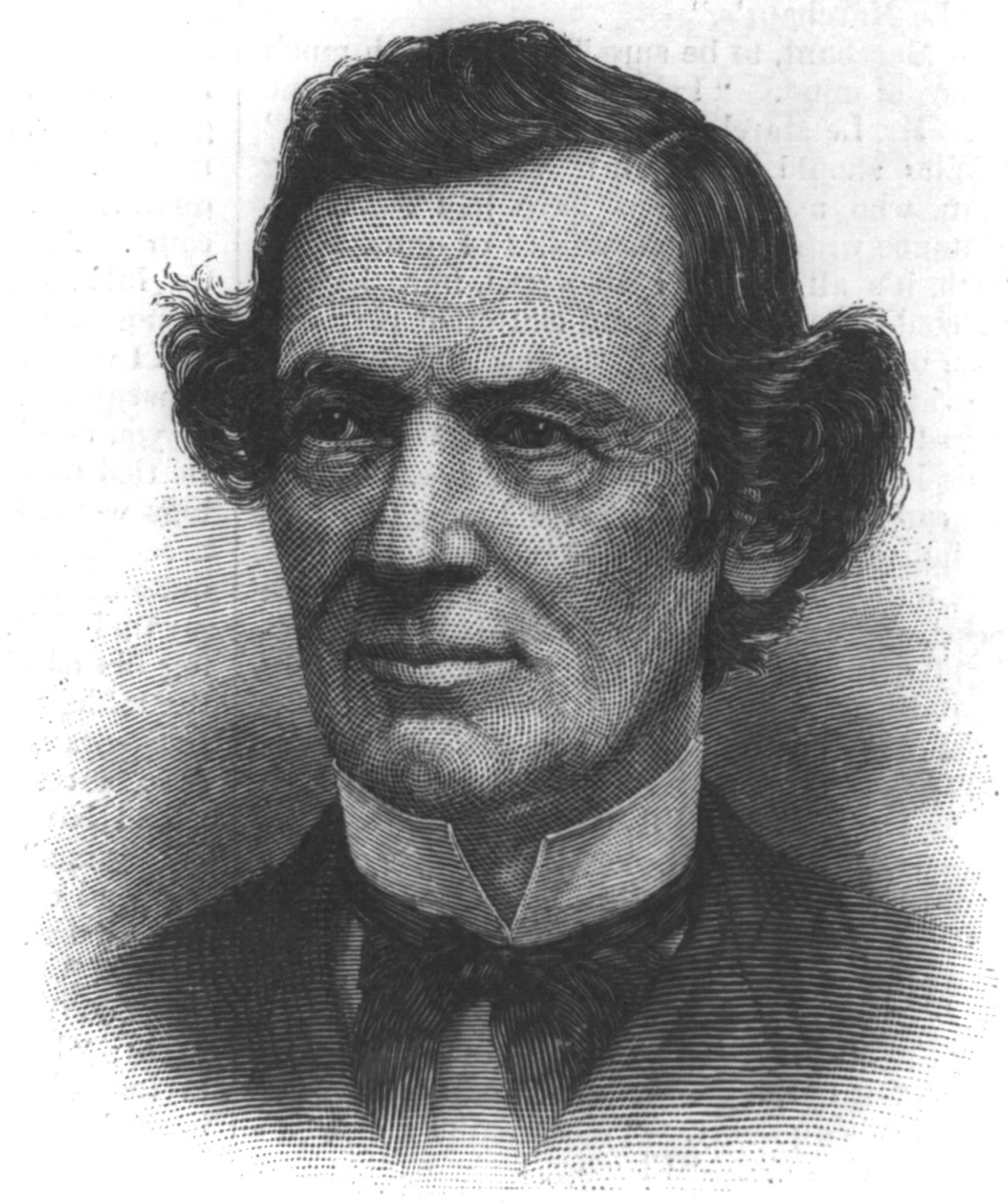
Robert McClane

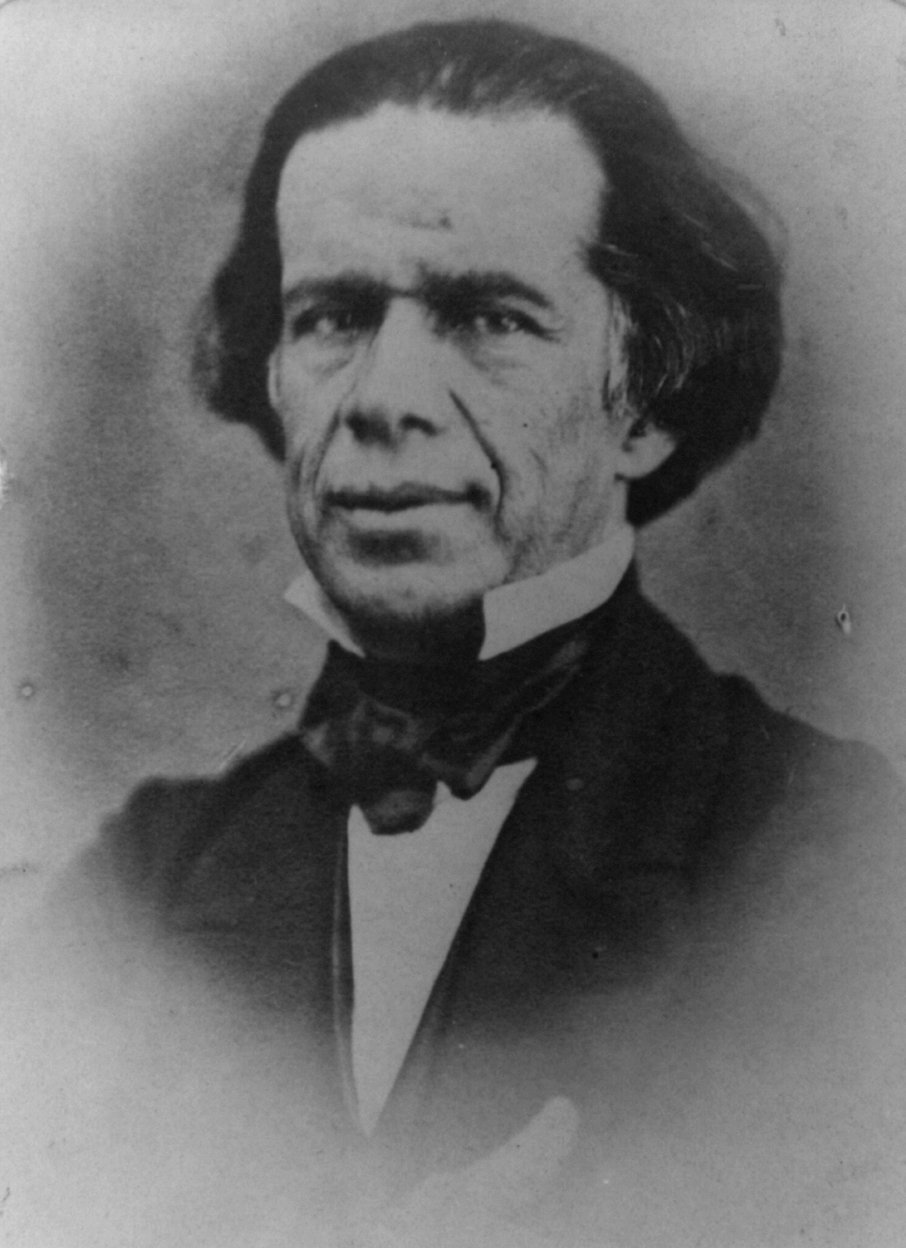
Melchor Ocampo

The McLane–Ocampo Treaty, formally the Treaty of Transit and Commerce, was an 1859 agreement negotiated between the United States and Mexico, during Mexico's War of the Reform, when the Veracruz based liberal government of Benito Juárez was fighting against the Mexico City based conservative government.

The treaty granted perpetual transit, military and other extraterritorial rights to the United States and its citizens on Mexican soil and was controversial in both Mexico and the United States. For Mexico, it was seen as a betrayal of the country by ceding sovereignty to the United States, which had already defeated Mexico and annexed vast amounts of its territory in the Mexican–American War a decade before, but it promised the financially strapped liberal government the means to continue the war against conservatives.

Newspapers in Europe and in the United States expressed astonishment at the magnitude of the concessions that had been made and opined that the treaty would turn Mexico into a protectorate of the United States. Ultimately, the U.S. Senate rejected ratification of the treaty in 1860. If it had been ratified, it would have given major control over Mexican territory that was seen as a crucial transit point from the Caribbean to the Pacific Ocean.

== Background ==
During the Reform War, the Conservatives sought financial support from Spain. The Mon-Almonte Treaty was signed on 26 September 1859 by Juan Almonte, Mexican conservative and Alejandro Mon y Menéndez, representative of Queen Isabella II of Spain, in Mexico.

The McLane-Ocampo Treaty was negotiated by Robert M. McLane, U.S. Ambassador to Mexico, and Melchor Ocampo, Mexican Minister of Foreign Affairs. It was signed in the port of Veracruz in Mexico on December 14, 1859. It would have sold the perpetual right of transit to the Isthmus of Tehuantepec to the U.S. for $4 million through the Mexican ports of Tehuantepec in the south, to Coatzacoalcos in the Gulf of Mexico free of any charge or duty, for military and commercial effects and troops. It even required Mexican troops to assist in the enforcement of the rights permanently granted to the U.S.

Additionally, it granted perpetual rights of passage through two strings of Mexican land: one that would run through the state of Sonora from the port of Guaymas on the Gulf of California, to Nogales, on the border with Arizona; and another one from the western port of Mazatlán, in the state of Sinaloa, going through Monterrey all the way through Matamoros, Tamaulipas, south of present-day Brownsville, Texas, on the Gulf of Mexico. Mexico was also compelled to build storage facilities on either side of the Tehuantepec isthmus.

Of the $4 million for the total cost of those benefits, the U.S. would pay immediately $2 million to the Mexican government, and the rest would stay in U.S. hands in provision for payments to U.S. citizens suing the Mexican government for damages to their rights.

Although U.S. President James Buchanan strongly favored the arrangement, and Mexican President Benito Juárez badly needed the money to finance the war that he was waging against the Conservative Party, the treaty was never ratified by the U.S. Senate because of the imminent civil war in the U.S., whose northern free states were concerned that its provisions, particularly the free transit of military effects and troops through the isthmus, would benefit the soon-to-become Confederate States if there was an open civil war.

The U.S. hoped to build a railroad or canal across the isthmus to speed transport of mail and trade goods between the eastern and western coasts. Roads there and in Nicaragua and Panama already carried considerable traffic.

== Treaty contents ==
The treaty granted the American government or its citizens the perpetual right of transit by three paths across the nation: by railway or other means through the Isthmus of Tehuantepec, by railway from the Rio Grande across the states of Tamaulipas, Coahuila, and Nuevo Leon, Durango, and Sinaloa to the port of Mazatlan, or by railway from the New Mexico Territory across the state of Sonora to the port of Guaymas. It granted also, in connection with that right of transit, the right for Americans to establish warehouses at the terminals of the aforementioned paths, to navigate the waters communicating with them, and to transport effects and merchandise through them to other parts of the United States free of duties unless imported into Mexico for consumption.

Article 8 granted the United States the right of transporting troops and military supplies across the Republic of Mexico through the Sonora and Tehuantepec Routes and Article 9 granted the United States government the right to protect the aforementioned transport routes by military force, if the Mexican government failed to do so.

Article 11 protected American citizens from being subject to forced loans by the Mexican government.

== Legacy in Mexico ==
For Mexicans who consider President Benito Juárez a nationalist hero who defended the nation's sovereignty against the French intervention in Mexico, the McLane-Ocampo Treaty gives fuel to Juárez's critics who see him as not being so ideologically pure. Juárez authorized U.S. ships to attack Mexican conservative vessels in 1860, prompting critics' charges that Juárez "condoned foreign intervention and sold out to the United States." In the U.S. the unratified treaty garners little attention from scholars, but in Mexico it is the subject of major studies.

== See also ==
- La Reforma
- Mexico–United States relations
- Platt Amendment
- North American Free Trade Agreement
- Panama Canal Zone
