= Juan Bautista Ormaechea =

Roman Catholic priest (1812–1884)

Juan Bautista de Ormaechea
- Bishop of Tulancingo
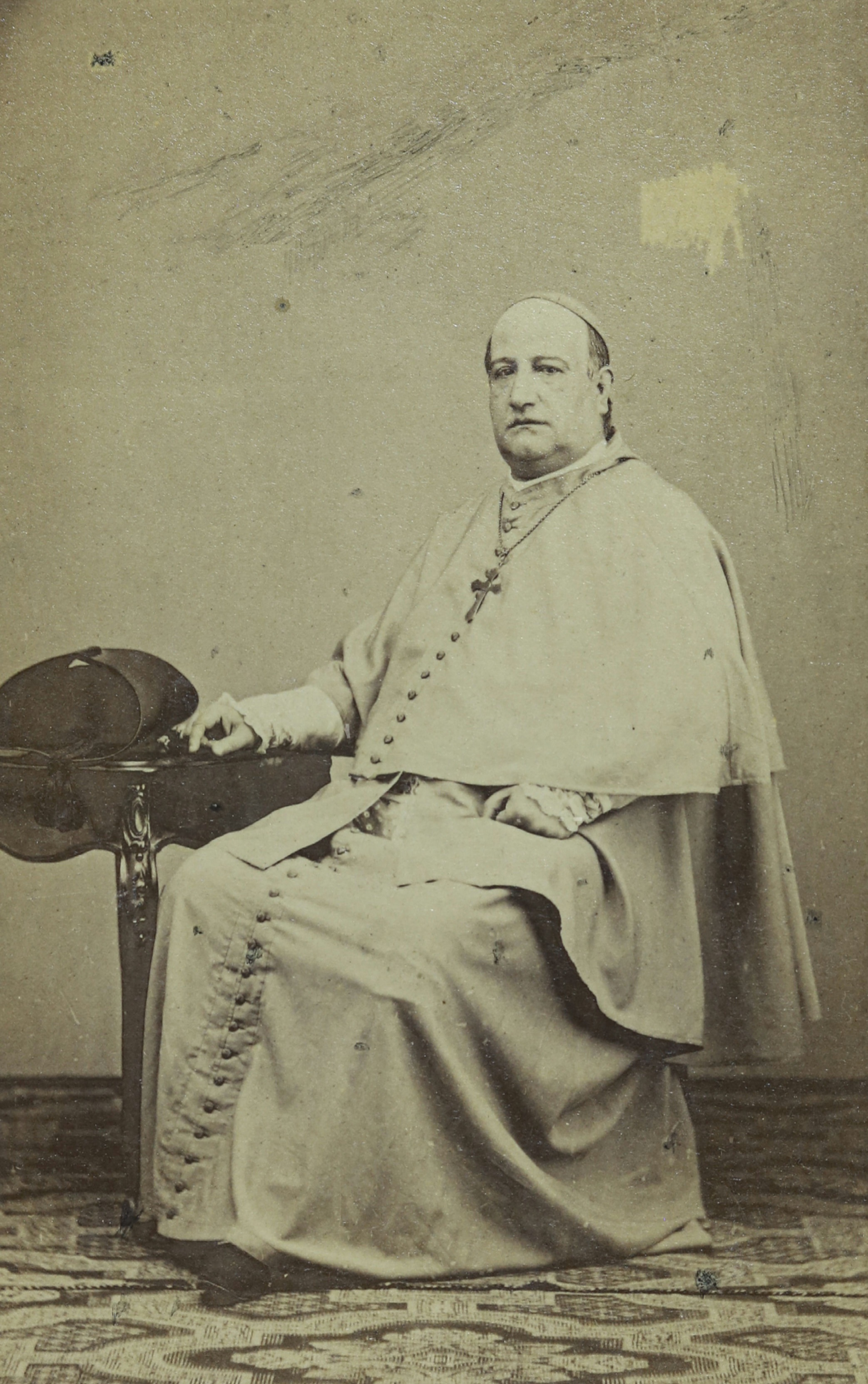
- See: Tulancingo
- Installed: March 19, 1863
- Term ended: March 19, 1884
- Predecessor: Position established
- Successor: Agustín de Jesús Torres y Hernandez

Personal details
- Born: May 17, 1812 Mexico City, New Spain
- Died: March 19, 1884 (aged 71) Tulancingo, Hidalgo, Mexico
- Denomination: Roman Catholic

Regent of the Mexican Empire with José Salas and Juan Almonte
- In office 17 November 1863 – 20 May 1864
- Succeeded by: Maximilian I (as Emperor)

Juan Bautista Ormaechea y Ernáiz (May 17, 1812 – March 19, 1884) was a Roman Catholic Mexican priest and academic who served as the Bishop of Tulancingo (1863–1884). He also served as a member of the regency of the Second Mexican Empire (1863–1864) after replacing Pelagio Antonio de Labastida.

== Biography ==
Ormaechea was born into a large family of Basque descent on May 17, 1812, in Mexico City, New Spain; his parents were Brigadier General José Ignacio Ormaechea and María Manuela Ernaiz y Zavala.

He obtained a doctorate in law at the Royal and Pontifical University of Mexico, later working as a professor for many years and being ordained a priest in 1836. Ormaechea was appointed as the canon of the Metropolitan Cathedral, and soon involved himself in Consevative circles as an opponent of La Reforma (The Reform), which was led by Liberals like Benito Juárez. In March 1863, Ormaechea was appointed Bishop of Tulancingo, a highly prestigious position he held until his death.

Ormaechea exiled to Rome following the fall of the Second Empire and the execution of Emperor Maximilian I. Shortly before his eventual return to Mexico, he was invited by the Royal Spanish Academy to become a founding member of the Mexican Academy of Language in 1875. Ormaechea died a few years later on March 19, 1884, in Tulancingo.

== See also ==
- History of Mexico
- Catholic Church in Mexico
