= Pelagio Antonio de Labastida y Dávalos =

Mexican Roman Catholic prelate, lawyer, doctor of canon law and politician

The Most Reverend Pelagio Antonio de Labastida y Dávalos
- Archbishop of Mexico
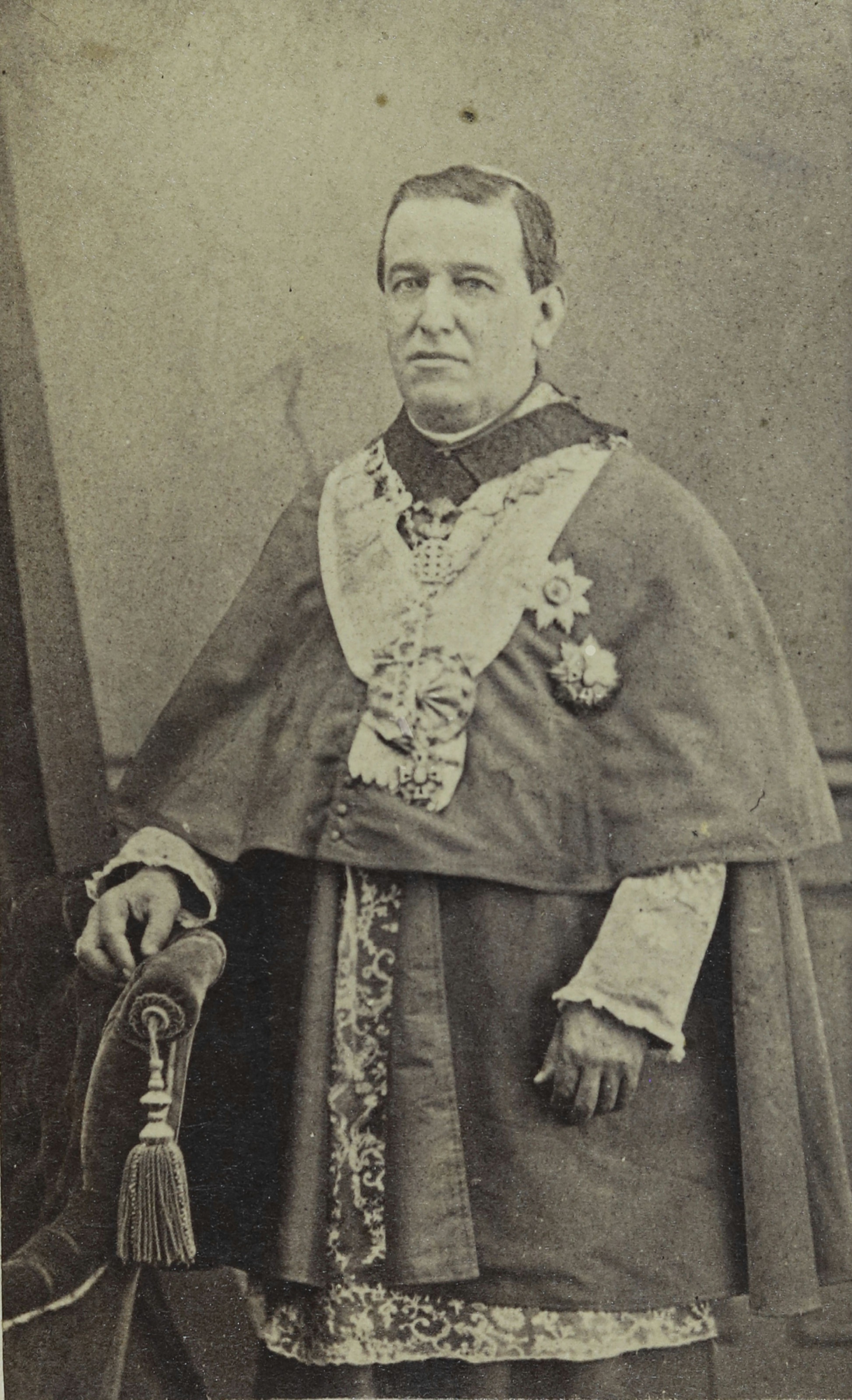
- See: Mexico
- Installed: March 19, 1863
- Term ended: February 4, 1891
- Predecessor: José Lázaro de la Garza y Ballesteros
- Successor: Próspero María Alarcón y Sánchez de la Barquera
- Previous post: Archbishop of Puebla (1855–1863)

Orders
- Ordination: November 10, 1839
- Consecration: July 8, 1855

Personal details
- Born: March 21, 1816 Zamora, Michoacán, New Spain (now Mexico)
- Died: February 4, 1891 (aged 74) Yautepec, Morelos, Mexico
- Denomination: Roman Catholic

Regent of the Mexican Empire with José Salas and Juan Almonte
- In office 11 July 1863 – 17 November 1863
- Succeeded by: Juan Bautista Ormaechea

Pelagio Antonio de Labastida y Dávalos (March 21, 1816 - February 4, 1891) was a Roman Catholic Mexican prelate, lawyer, and doctor of canon law. He notably served as the Archbishop of Mexico (1863-1891), and was a regent of the Second Mexican Empire (1863) until eventually being dismissed from the position and replaced by Juan Bautista Ormaechea.

== Early life and career ==
Labastida was born on March 21, 1816, into a wealthy family of partial Basque heritage in the town of Zamora; he was the youngest son of Manuel Luciano Labastida and María Luisa Dávalos Ochoa.

=== Ecclesiastical career ===
He entered the Seminario Conciliar of Morelia in 1830, where he was later professor and director. His classmates in the seminary included Clemente Murguía, future archbishop of Michoacán, and Melchor Ocampo, future foreign minister of the Republic.

Labastida was ordained in 1839. He soon became known as a conservative orator, preaching against all liberal and democratic ideas and against the Freemasons. He was a canon in Morelia in 1854. He opposed the doctrines of liberals Melchor Ocampo and Miguel Lerdo de Tejada from the pulpit, calling them heretical. After the triumph of the Conservatives and on the nomination of Antonio López de Santa Anna, in July 1855 he was consecrated bishop of Puebla, in the cathedral of Mexico City.

In December 1855 he used funds of the diocese to aid the revolt of Antonio Haro y Tamariz, because the federal government had ordered the sale of some of the real estate of the diocese.

After the Liberals returned to power in 1857, Labastida went into exile in Europe, where he supported the Conservative government. However the Conservatives were again in power in 1859, under General Miguel Miramón. Miramón recalled him to the country.

Later he was again exiled to Europe. In 1862 he visited Maximilian of Habsburg in Trieste. At the beginning of the following year, he went to Italy to meet Pope Pius IX. On March 18, 1863, Pope Pius named him archbishop of Mexico.

=== The French intervention ===
The French invaded Mexico in 1862. General Forey entered the capital on June 10, 1863, and convoked a Council of Notables to discuss the founding of an empire. There was agreement on the empire, but disagreement over who should receive the crown. It was Labastida who proposed Maximilian of Austria, and the proposal was adopted by acclamation.

On June 21, 1863, together with Juan Nepomuceno Almonte and José Mariano Salas, Labastida was named by the Council of Notables to the Regency of the Empire (before the arrival of Maximilian). This triumvirate sent a commission to Europe to offer the crown to Maximilian.

Labastida was removed on November 17, 1863, due to differences with François Achille Bazaine, commander of the French troops. (Bazaine intended to apply the Napoleonic program on ecclesiastical property, and Labastida was opposed.) His replacement was Juan Bautista de Ormaechea, bishop of Tulancingo.

Likewise his relation with Maximilian decayed, when the latter proclaimed freedom of religion in the country.

With the end of the Empire and the triumph of the Republic in 1867, Labastida returned to Europe more or less permanently, but without resigning his position as head of the Catholic Church in Mexico. In that capacity he attended the Vatican Council of 1869–70. In 1871 following the restoration of the Republic, President Benito Juárez permitted him to return to the country.

== See also ==
- List of heads of state of Mexico
- Conservatism in Mexico
- French Intervention in Mexico
- First Vatican Council
- History of Roman Catholicism in Mexico
