= Grito =

Mexican interjection

A grito or grito mexicano (Spanish pronunciation: [ˈɡɾito]; Spanish for "shout") is a common Mexican interjection, used as an expression.

== Characteristics ==
This interjection is similar to the yahoo or yeehaw of the American cowboy during a hoedown, with added ululation trills and onomatopoeia closer to "aaah" or "aaaayyyyeeee", that resemble a laugh while performing it.

The first sound is typically held as long as possible, leaving enough breath for a trailing set of trills.

== Usage ==
The grito is sometimes used as part of the official remembrance of the Shout of Dolores, during the celebration of Mexican Independence Day.

The el grito mexicano has patriotic connotations.

It is commonly done immediately prior to the popular Mexican war cry: "¡Viva Mexico, Señores!" (Long live Mexico, Gentlemen!).
