= Mon-Almonte Treaty =

1859 treaty between Spain and Mexico

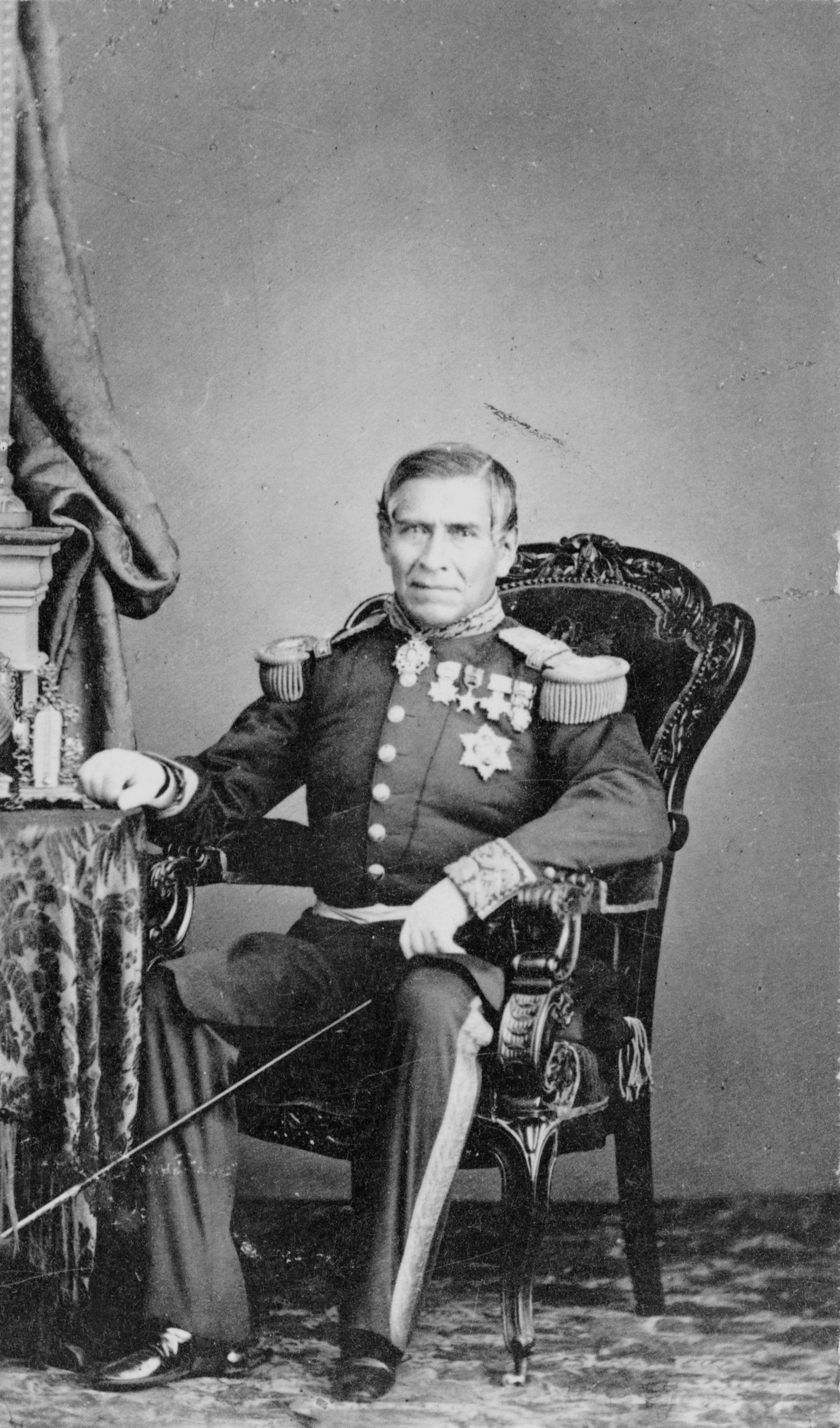
Juan Almonte

The Mon-Almonte Treaty restored relations between Mexico and Spain. It was signed on 26 September 1859 by Juan Almonte, Mexican conservative and Alejandro Mon y Menéndez, representative of Queen Isabella II of Spain, in Mexico.

The treaty was signed by Mexican conservatives in their search for support in their struggle against liberals during the Reform War. Among the main aspects of the treaty was a loan to the conservative faction, which had to be paid on their triumph, but the debt ended up with the Liberal government, which won the war, and thus added to Mexico's already-large external debt with European nations.

With the treaty, conservatives sought to draw the attention of European crowns to support their cause, but like the 1859 McLane-Ocampo Treaty between the liberal government of Benito Juárez and the United States, it never entered into force.

== See also ==
- Reform War
