= Francisco Severo Maldonado =

Mexican politician

Francisco Severo Maldonado y Ocampo
- Born: 1775; Tepic, Nueva Galicia, New Spain
- Died: May 8, 1832 (aged 56–57); Guadalajara, Jalisco, Mexico
- Education: Guadalajara Seminary
- Era: Spanish American wars of independence

Francisco Severo Maldonado y Ocampo (1775 in Tepic, Nueva Galicia – May 8, 1832 in Guadalajara, Jalisco) was a philosopher, Catholic priest, professor and writer from New Spain. He joined the insurgent movement during the Mexican War of Independence.

== Biography ==
He obtained a master's degree in Philosophy and a doctorate in Theology from the Guadalajara Seminary. He taught classes at his alma mater. He was the parish priest of Ixtlán and Mascota. He had the idea of publishing a newspaper in favor of the insurgent cause, after meeting with Miguel Hidalgo in Guadalajara he began to edit El Despertador Americano on December 20, 1810. He was helped in editing by Ángel de la Sierra.

After the defeat of the insurgents in the battle of Calderón Bridge, the publication of the newspaper was suspended, the printing press was raided by the royalists on January 28, 1811. Maldonado was tried and forced to recant. He was forced to collaborate in the edition of the newspaper El Telégrafo de Guadalajara, which was totally against the independence cause.

He was elected deputy to the Cortes of Cádiz, however once the Independence of Mexico was declared he canceled his trip. Being the parish priest of Jalostotitlán he was called to sign the Declaration of Independence of the Mexican Empire. He was a member of the Provisional Government and a deputy of the Constituent Congress of 1822. In 1822, he published the Fanal del Imperio Mexicano in which he included his philosophical and political thought through the works "El pacto social de los mexicanos o Miscelánea Política", "Nuevo pacto social propuesto a la Nación española" and the "Contrato de Asociación para la República de los Estados Unidos del Anáhuac". He died in the city of Guadalajara on May 8, 1832.

== Bibliography ==
- Rovira, Carmen (1998). Pensamiento filosófico mexicano del siglo XIX y primeros años del XX (in Spanish). México: Universidad Nacional Autónoma de México. ISBN 968-36-6643-4.
- Trueba Atienza, Carmen (2000). Racionalidad: lenguaje, argumentación y acción (in Spanish). México: Plaza y Valdés. ISBN 968-856-800-7.
