= José Antonio Joaquín Pérez Martínez y Robles =

Mexican bishop (1763–1829)

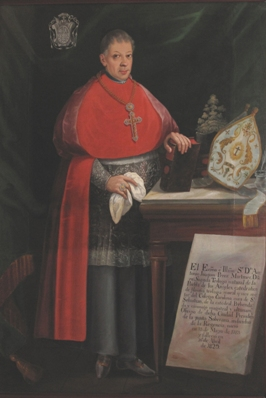
- Born: 13 May 1763; Puebla, Mexico
- Died: 26 April 1829 (aged 65); Puebla, Mexico
- Known for: Deputy to the Cortes of Cádiz, Member of the Liberal Party, Signer of the Manifesto of the Persians, Bishop of Puebla

José Antonio Joaquín Pérez Martínez y Robles (13 May 1763 – 26 April 1829) was a prominent criollo priest and bishop.

He was a priest for about 41 years and a bishop for about 14 years.

== Biography ==
He was born 13 May 1763 in Puebla, Mexico, to his father Francisco and died 26 April 1829 at the age of 65 in the same place.

He was an active member of Puebla society who, following the customs of the time and as a member of the Pérez y Martínez y Robles families of Puebla, was dedicated to the priesthood.

=== Deputy to the Cortes ===
In 1810 he was elected deputy to the Cortes of Cádiz. Due to his liberal ideas, he participated in the debates to abolish the Holy Inquisition, allow freedom of the press and expand the sovereignty of the different political entities that made up the Spanish Empire at the time.

As a member of the liberal party, he participated in the promulgation of the Spanish Constitution of 1812, but later, due to his religious conscience, he aligned himself with the absolutist party, for which he signed the Manifesto of the Persians, where he requested the reform of the Constitution.

=== Bishop of Puebla ===
Back in Mexico, and due to the death of Bishop Manuel Ignacio González de Campillo Gómez del Valle, José Antonio Joaquín Pérez Martínez y Robles was named bishop of the city of Puebla in absentia on 19 December 1814 taking the position until his return in 1815. He stayed out of politics during the War of Independence, but on several occasions he is investigated for suspicion of belonging to the subversive group Los Guadalupes.

=== Independence of Mexico ===
Subsequently, he moved with the viceroy Juan O'Donojú to Mexico City, staying in the Palace of the former Archbishopric in Tacubaya under the protection of the Trigarante Army, he entered the city with the viceroy and achieved the peaceful evacuation of the Spanish forces, For this reason, he is part of the official delegation that received General Agustín de Iturbide at the door of what is now the National Palace, to later be the first signatory of the Act of Independence of the Mexican Empire.

== Published Works ==
- El Obispo De La Puebla a sus diocesanos

Bibliography (French Wiki)
(es) Lucas Alamán, , México DF, Fondo de Cultura Económica, 1985; (es) Carmen Blázquez Domínguez, , Mexico, Government of the State of Veracruz, Veracruzano Institute of Culture,1988, 369 p. (ISBN 978-968-61-7360-4, BNF 40009536); (es) Francisco Bulnes, , Mexico, Federal District, 1910, 1910; (es) Carlos María de Bustamante, , Mexico City, INEHRM, 1843 (reprint 1985); (es) Luis Garfias Magana, , Mexico City, Panorama, 1980, 138 p.	Alexander Von Humboldt, , Paris,1811; (es) Luis Pazos, , Mexico City, Diana,1993, 165 p. (ISBN 978-968-13-2560-2, BNF 37498961); (es) Guillermo Prieto, , Editorial Pátria, 1828 (reprint 1906); Vicente Rivas Palacio (coord.), Julio Zárate, , vol. III: The War of Independence (1808-1821), Mexico City, Summit, 1880 (reprint 1970); Vicente Rivas Palacio (coord.), Juan de Dios Arias, Enrique de Olavarría y Ferrari, vol. IV: Independent Mexico (1821-1855), Mexico City, Summit, 1880 (reprint 1970)
