= José Isidro Yáñez =

Political figure in Mexico (1759 - 1832)

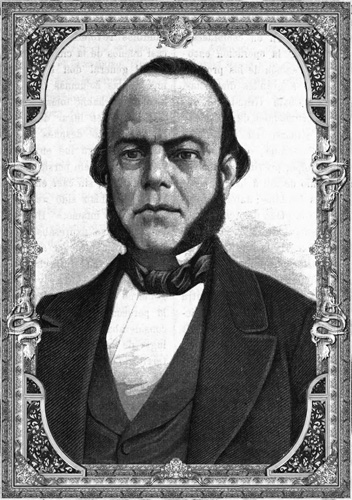

Regent of the Mexican Empire
- In office 28 September 1821 – 11 April 1822
- Preceded by: Manuel de la Barcéna
- Succeeded by: Agustín de Iturbide (Emperor of Mexican Empire)
- Monarch: Agustín de Iturbide

Personal details
- Born: 1759 Viceroyalty of New Granada
- Died: 7 September 1832 (aged 72–73) Mexico City, First Mexican Empire

Military service
- Battles/wars: Spanish–Mexican War

José Isidro Yáñez y Nuño (Caracas, Viceroyalty of New Granada, 1759 – Toluca, State of Mexico, September 7, 1832) was a political figure in Mexico, active during the final phase of the Mexican War of Independence and the period of the First Mexican Empire.

== Life ==
José Isidro Yáñez was a member of the Provisional Legislative Board in 1821 as a juez of the Audiencia of Mexico, and then Yáñez was appointed to the First Regency of the First Mexican Empire on September 28, 1821, and he served until April 11, 1822, with Agustín de Iturbide, Antonio Pérez Martínez y Robles, Manuel de la Bárcena, and Manuel Velázquez de León y Pérez. Subsequently, Yáñez was appointed to the Second Regency, from April 11 to May 18, 1822, with Agustín de Iturbide, Miguel Valentín y Tamayo, Manuel de Heras Soto, and Nicolás Bravo.
