= Manuel Velázquez de León =

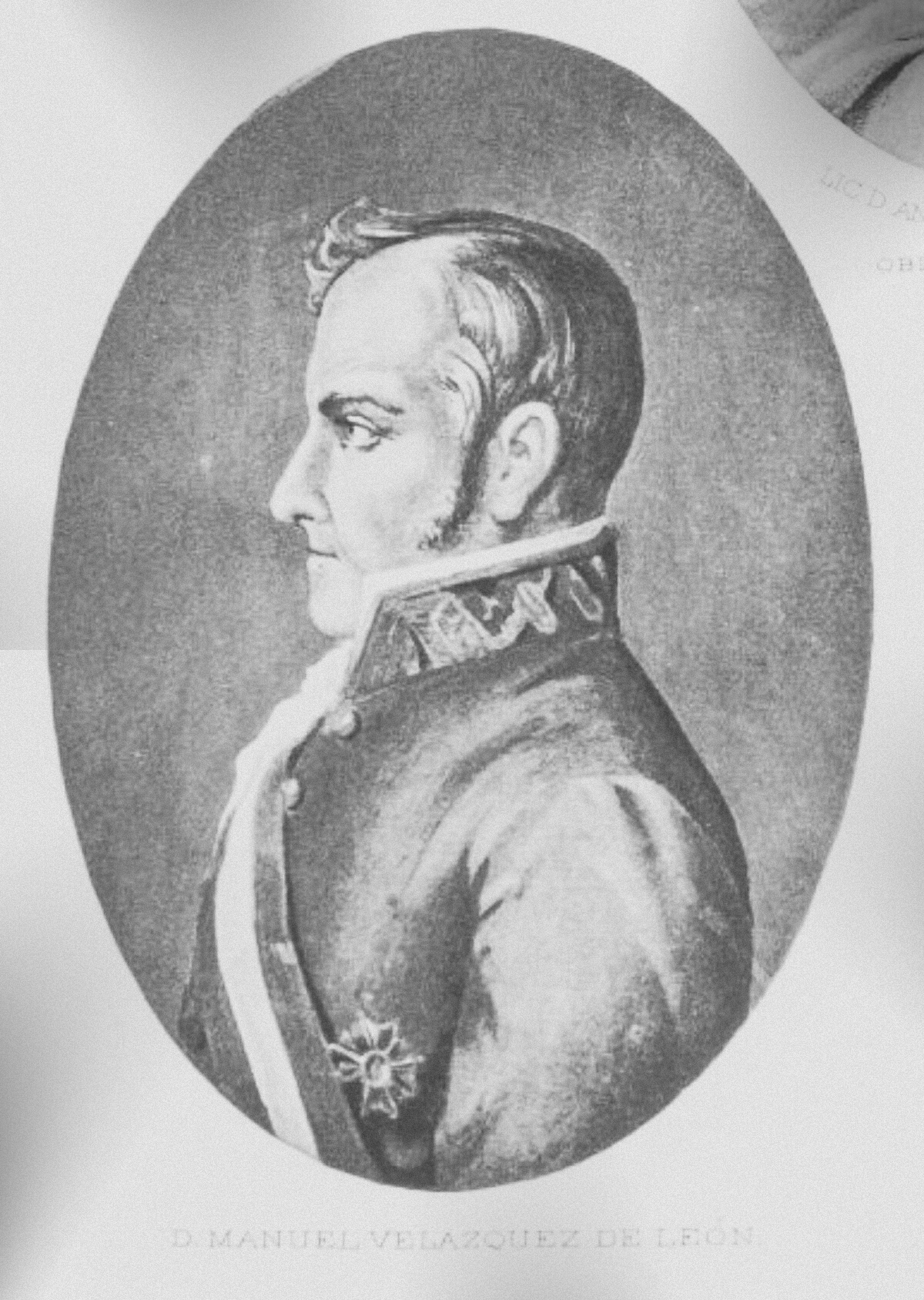

Regent of the Mexican Empire
- In office 28 September 1821 – 11 April 1822
- Preceded by: Manuel de la Barcéna
- Succeeded by: Agustín de Iturbide (Emperor of Mexican Empire)
- Monarch: Agustín de Iturbide

Personal details
- Born: 1756 Municipality of Capulhuac
- Died: 19th century Mexico City, First Mexican Empire

Military service
- Battles/wars: Spanish–Mexican War

Manuel Velázquez de León was a regent of the First Mexican Empire.

== Life ==
Manuel Velázquez de León y Pérez (1756, Capulhuac, Intendancy of Mexico, New Spain) was a Mexican politician. He served in many administrative offices, including honorary intendant of a province, treasurer of papal bulls, director of public finances in Mexico, and councilor of state. Following independence, Velázquez de León y Pérez joined the Provisional Governing Board, and subsequently served on the First Regency of the First Mexican Empire from September 28, 1821, to April 11, 1822, as a member along with Agustín de Iturbide, Juan O’Donojú, José Isidro Yáñez, Antonio Joaquín Pérez Martínez, and Manuel de la Bárcena.
