= Adrián Woll =

French-Mexican general (1795–1875)

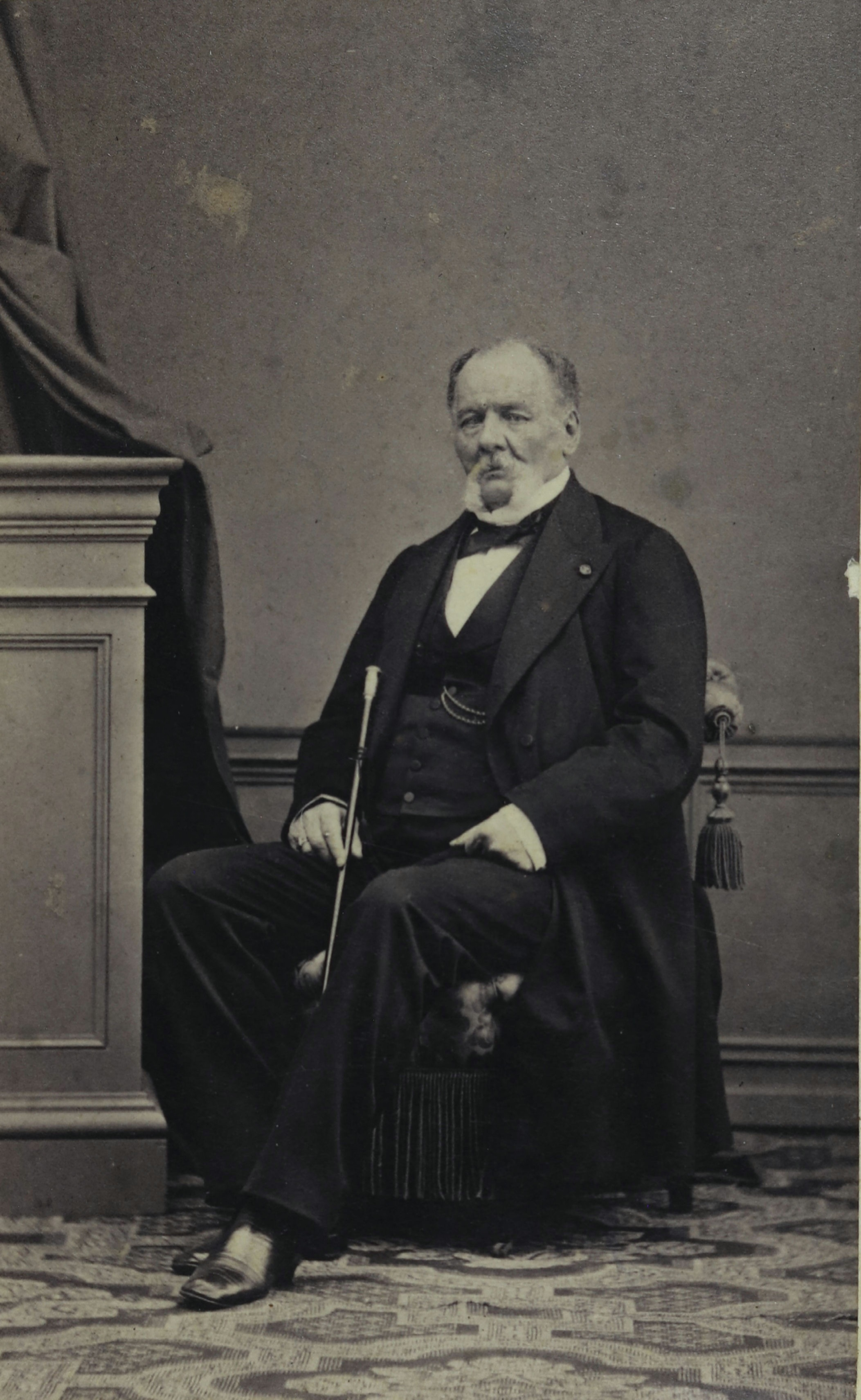
- Woll in 1865

Governor of Tamaulipas
- In office 4 April 1855 – 8 September 1855
- Preceded by: Rómulo Díaz de la Vega
- Succeeded by: Juan José de la Garza Cisneros
- In office 2 May 1853 – 28 January 1855
- Preceded by: Juan Francisco Villasana
- Succeeded by: Rómulo Díaz de la Vega

Member of the Assembly of Notables
- In office 8 July 1863 – 19 June 1867

Member of the Mexican deputation to Miramar
- In office August 1863 – 10 April 1864 Serving with José María Gutiérrez de Estrada and others
- Appointed by: Assembly of Notables

Personal details
- Born: Adrien Marie Woll; 2 December 1795 Saint-Germain-en-Laye, French First Republic
- Died: February 1875 (aged 79) Montauban, French Third Republic
- Spouse: Lucinda Vautrey Griggi
- Occupation: Military officer; politician; diplomat
- Awards: Order of Guadalupe; Order of the Mexican Eagle; Order of the Legion of Honour; Order of Franz Joseph; Order of St. Gregory the Great

Military service
- Allegiance: First French Empire; Mexican Insurgency; Mexican Republic; Second Mexican Empire
- Branch/service: French Army; Mexican Army
- Years of service: 1814–1865
- Rank: Captain (France); Division general (Mexico)
- Battles/wars: Napoleonic Wars; Battle of Paris; Mexican War of Independence; Xavier Mina's campaign; Siege of Soto la Marina; Battle of Fuerte del Sombrero; Spanish attempts to reconquer Mexico; Battle of Tampico; Plan of Veracruz; Battle of Taxinastla; Mexican Federalist Wars; Zacatecas Rebellion; Texas Revolution; Woll Expedition; Capture of San Antonio; Battle of Salado Creek; Battle of the Arroyo Hondo; Mexican–American War; Revolution of Ayutla; Reform War; Second Franco-Mexican War

Adrián Woll (also Adrien Woll and, in some sources, Adrián Woll d'Obm; 2 December 1795 – February 1875) was a French-Mexican general whose nearly fifty-year career ran from the Mexican War of Independence to the Second Mexican Empire. Born in the French First Republic, he served in the Napoleonic Wars before arriving in Mexico in 1816 as a part of Martín Xavier Mina's División Auxiliar de la República Mexicana. After independence he remained in the Mexican army in the circle of Antonio López de Santa Anna. He later governed Tamaulipas, held commands on the northern frontier, including the 1842 occupation of San Antonio de Béxar, and ended his public career as an aide to Emperor Maximilian I of Mexico.

== Early life and Napoleonic service ==
Born Adrien Marie Woll on 2 December 1795 at Saint-Germain-en-Laye, west of Paris. He was educated for a military career and served as a lieutenant in a lancer regiment of the Imperial Guard. Because that regiment contained many Poles, later writers sometimes misidentified him as Polish. In 1814 he took part in the Battle of Paris; in 1815, during the Hundred Days, he was captain and adjutant-major in the 10th Legion of the National Guard of the Seine.

After the Bourbon Restoration he left France for the United States with letters of introduction to Winfield Scott, then at Baltimore. Scott, according to later accounts, pointed him toward the Mexican independence movement as an outlet for a trained officer.

== Mexican War of Independence ==
On 3 July 1816, in Baltimore, Woll joined the staff of Martin Xavier Mina. He sailed with Mina’s expedition and landed near the mouth of the Santander River in April 1817, taking part in the seizure of Soto la Marina a few days later.

Accounts of how far he followed Mina inland disagree. Texan and later U.S. narratives often have him sent on an errand to New Orleans and returning after the expedition had already collapsed. French biographical tradition, places him with Mina and Pedro Moreno in the Bajío, including the defense of the Fuerte del Sombrero. After Mina’s capture and execution, Woll remained in New Spain, entered the forces that completed independence under Agustín de Iturbide and Vicente Guerrero and after the fall of the Mexican Empire stayed in the Mexican army in the circle of Antonio López de Santa Anna He became a naturalized Mexican citizen and married Lucinda Vautrey Griggi.

== First Republic, Tampico, and the Centralist Republic ==
Woll was commissioned a colonel in 1828 and served as aide-de-camp to Santa Anna in the campaign against the Spanish invasion in Tampico in 1829. For that campaign he received the Cross of Tampico and, in 1832, promotion to brigadier general. He was one of the officers charged with delivering the captured Spanish flag to Mexico City.

In 1832 he supported the Plan of Veracruz against President Anastasio Bustamante that restored Manuel Gómez Pedraza. From Guadalajara he defeated Joaquín Solórzano at Taxinastla, entered the Colima territory on 15 November, installed Pedraza adherents in office, and moved on toward Morelia. In 1835 he served as quartermaster general in Santa Anna’s campaign against the federalist risings of Juan Álvarez in the south and Francisco García Salinas in Zacatecas. He was described in this period of conflict between centralist and federalist as a “consistent partisan of order and progress” amid the succession of caudillos that followed Guadalupe Victoria's presidency.

== Texas Revolution ==
In 1836 Woll was quartermaster general of Santa Anna’s Ejército de Operaciones sobre Texas. He reached San Antonio de Béxar on 8 March and reported to Vicente Filisola, second in command. After the Alamo he accompanied Joaquín Ramírez y Sesma east toward Gonzales, San Felipe, and Anahuac. At Beeson’s Ferry on the Colorado they faced Sam Houston’s army; Houston withdrew. When Santa Anna reached the Colorado, Woll assigned a battalion to build rafts for Filisola’s remaining troops.

After San Jacinto, Filisola made Woll his chief of staff on 26 April and sent him to the Texian camp, officially to hear the terms of the armistice and in practice to gauge Texian strength. Woll rode in under a flag of truce on 30 April and was detained. Thomas J. Rusk sent him to Velasco and then Goliad; he was released and rejoined the retreating Mexican army on 12 June.

In 1842 Woll claimed that during the 1836 campaign he had persuaded Santa Anna to cancel the order to shoot James Fannin and his men, but that the counter-order arrived too late.

== Pastry War and the northern frontier ==
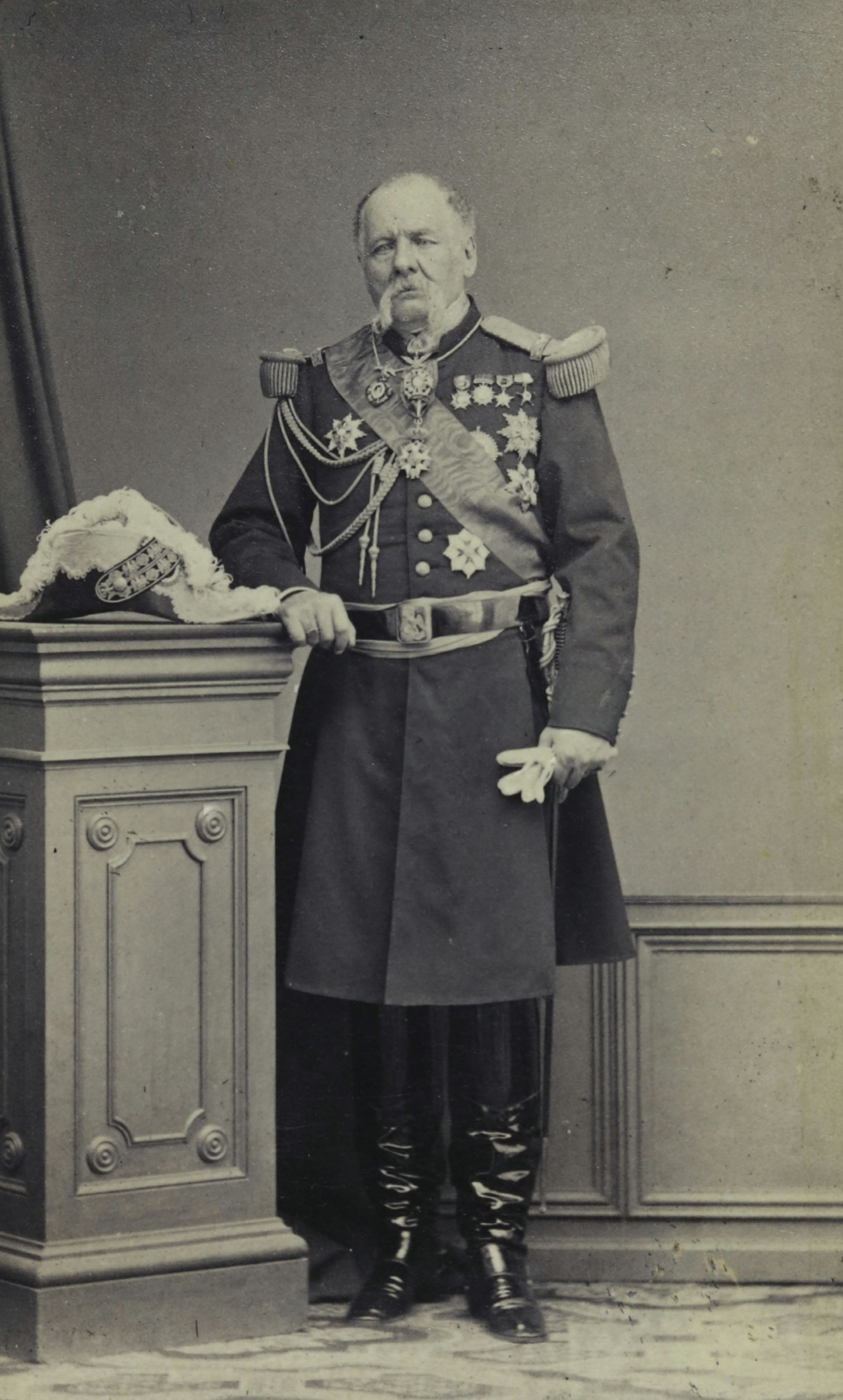
Woll in military attire

During the Pastry War of 1838–1839 Woll asked to resign rather than fight French troops. The Mexican government refused and placed him on inactive duty. After the French withdrawal he returned to service with the centralists against the federalists. In November 1840 he went to New Orleans to buy arms; some of the goods may have been tied to a smuggling operation run by his wife at Saltillo.

In December he was assigned to the northern frontier. In early June 1842 he became second in command to Isidro Reyes in Ejército del Norte and commandant general of the Department of Coahuila.

== Expedition into Texas, 1842 ==
On 5 June Reyes was ordered to prepare Woll's brigade for a second occupation of San Antonio de Béxar, followed by a reconnaissance down the Guadalupe River toward Gonzales, the whole operation not to exceed one month.

Woll crossed the Rio Grande at Presidio de San Juan Bautista by 30 August with the 2nd Division. Quartermaster Colonel José María Carrasco recorded 957 infantry and cavalry, two field pieces (a six-pounder and a four-pounder), a supply train, 919 horses and 213 mules.

He picked up remnants of the failed Córdova Rebellion. Its leader Vicente Córdova, former alcalde of Nacogdoches, brought his Mexican loyalist and survivors Texas-Cherokee War of 1839. Texian accounts put the auxiliaries at about forty Cherokees, plus a few Carrizo. Later Texan estimates of 1,600 men plus hundreds of Cherokee auxiliaries inflate that return. To avoid ranger patrols on the Laredo road Carrasco had the men open a route through the hills and mesquite west of Béxar, following an old smuggling path along the southern edge of the Edwards Plateau so that Texian scouts on the main roads would not detect it.

=== Capture and occupation of Béxar ===
On the morning of 11 September a dense fog covered the town. Cannon fire and a military band announced the column as it entered the Main Plaza. Roughly fifty to sixty men, Anglo residents, attorneys, and others in town for the fall term of the Fourth District Court, all fired from houses around the plaza, including the stone house of Samuel Maverick. The resistance lasted only minutes once the fog lifted and the defenders saw they were surrounded by regular infantry and presidial cavalry. After a short parley they surrendered as prisoners of war on Woll’s pledge of good treatment.

Juan Seguín commanded a company of Tejano exiles, the Defensores de Béxar, raised in Mexico from families driven out of San Antonio after death threats and rancho-burnings in the spring of 1842. They screened the approaches and helped cordon the town. Woll’s own return of 12 September listed fifty-two named prisoners; contemporary Texian counts put the total near sixty. Several prisoners were later released for youth, injury, or promises of future loyalty. Woll occupied Béxar for roughly a week, using the time to reconnoiter eastward and to collect information on any Texian concentration.

=== Salado Creek and Dawson ===
Volunteers under Mathew Caldwell and rangers under John Coffee Hays gathered on the east bank of Salado Creek, several miles from town. 17–18 September they drew part of the Mexican force out of Béxar. Mexican infantry and the two guns attacked a wooded creek line and did not break it. At dusk the Mexican troops fell back on the town. Texian losses on that front were one killed and about nine to twelve wounded; Texian claims of sixty Mexican dead are not matched in Woll's return.

While Caldwell’s force held its position on Salado Creek, a separate company of about fifty-three volunteers under Captain Nicholas Mosby Dawson, mostly men from Fayette County approached from the southeast to reinforce him. Between 3 and 4 p.m. on 18 September the company was intercepted roughly a mile and a half from Caldwell’s line by a Mexican cavalry column estimated at 500 men under colonels Cayetano Montero, José María Carrasco, and Pedro Rangel, supported by two field pieces.

Dawson’s men dismounted in a mesquite thicket. Rifle fire stopped the first mounted rush; once the artillery was in range the position collapsed shortly after becoming a short, close fight. Survivor and later Texian accounts state that Dawson, already wounded, raised a white flag or garment in an attempt to surrender; firing continued on both sides and he was killed. Mexican reports describe the engagement as a combat action and do not address a flag of surrender.

=== Withdrawal ===
After those actions Woll withdrew on the night of 19–20 September, taking the Anglo prisoners, Dawson's captured men, and a large number of Tejano families, as many as two hundred in Texian estimates. Hays and Caldwell overtook the rear near the Frio River on 21–22 September. Hays briefly seized a gun and was driven off by infantry and the remaining piece; Mexican losses in that scrape were about five killed. Woll then force-marched to the Presidio crossing and recrossed the Río Grande at the end of September, within the month allowed by his orders. The prisoners were marched to the interior and confined at Perote. Most were released in 1843–44.

The Mexican government treated the raid as a success: Béxar had been occupied, officials and a reinforcing company taken or destroyed, and the division brought home on schedule. Woll was promoted to general de división and awarded the Cross of Honor. He published the campaign as Expedición hecha en Tejas, por una parte de la 2a División del Cuerpo del Ejército del Norte (1842). In Texas the occupation and the Dawson Fight were used to justify the Somervell expedition and the unauthorized Mier expedition that followed.

== Army of the North, armistice with Texas, and war with the United States ==
In February 1843 Woll took command of the Ejército del Norte, a post he held until 6 December 1844, when that army joined the revolt of José Joaquín Herrera and Mariano Paredes y Arrillaga against Santa Anna. Woll was arrested and imprisoned, then freed under a general amnesty on 24 May 1845.

While on the frontier he sat on the Mexican commission that negotiated an armistice with Texas. Commissioners signed it on 15 February 1844 at Salinas on the Rio Grande. Mexico recalled its commissioners after learning that Texas was negotiating annexation in Washington and that the Texian delegates lacked authority for a permanent peace; Texas also claimed the Rio Grande rather than the Nueces as the boundary. On 19 June 1844, on orders from Mexico City, Woll sent Sam Houston a formal declaration of war.

Secondary accounts differ on his service in 1846–1848. Some state that he remained with the Mexican army until Santa Anna’s defeat in 1847 and then left for Europe. A European service summary states that he was on leave in France and saw no field service during the war.

== Governor of Tamaulipas ==
In 1852 Woll joined Santa Anna in Havana and returned with him to Mexico. On Santa Anna’s restoration as president he was named governor and commandant general of Tamaulipas, with his authority later extended over Nuevo León and Coahuila when unrest spread. He served until 28 January 1855, was replaced briefly by Rómulo Díaz de la Vega, and returned for a second term from 4 April to 8 September 1855. After the Revolution of Ayutla forced Santa Anna out, Woll left Mexico again.

== Reform War ==
Woll came back in 1859 as a supporter of conservative president Miguel Miramón against the liberal government of Benito Juárez. He landed at Mocambo on 22 March 1859 with Rómulo Díaz de la Vega, Víctor Blanco, and two sons of Santa Anna, reported to Miramón, and received a field command. He defeated Santos Degollado near León on 30 August 1859, occupied Zacatecas in November, and successfully defended Guadalajara in May 1860. When Miramón’s government collapsed on 24 December 1860, Woll returned to France.

== French intervention and the Second Empire ==
In 1862 he accompanied French forces to Mexico and was named commandant general of Veracruz. In March 1863 he met the Confederate agent Antoine Supervièle, who urged a French seizure of Matamoros. He sat on the Junta Superior de Gobierno created under French occupation. That body and the Asamblea de Notables opted for a monarchy and sent a deputation, including Woll,to offer the crown to Archduke Ferdinand Maximilian of Austria. Maximilian accepted on 10 April 1864.

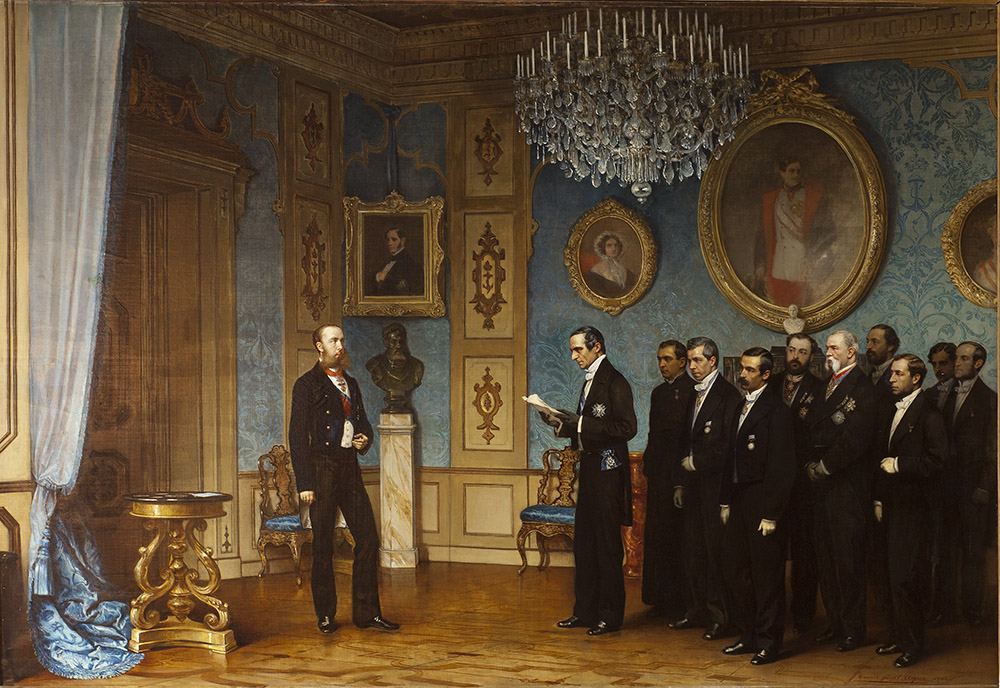
The Mexican Delegation appoints Ferdinand Maximilian of Austria as Emperor of Mexico (1867) by Cesare Dell'Acqua. Woll is fifth from the right.

Maximilian asked Woll to draft a plan for organizing Mexican armed forces. When the emperor landed on 28 May 1864, Woll became adjutant general of the occupation forces and chief aide-de-camp; he was made a commander of the Legion of Honour. Contemporary and later accounts also credit him with Mexican and Habsburg decorations, including the Order of Guadalupe, the Order of the Mexican Eagle and the Imperial Order of Franz Joseph.

In the autumn of 1865 Maximilian, at odds with Marshal François Achille Bazaine, sent Woll to Napoleon III. Woll learned that France intended to withdraw its troops beginning in 1866 and did not return to Mexico.

== Exile and death ==
After the fall of the empire Woll remained in France. He died at Montauban, north of Toulouse, in February 1875, aged 79.

== See also ==
- Battle of Salado Creek (1842)
- Miguel Miramón
- Second French intervention in Mexico
- Second Mexican Empire
