= Córdova Rebellion =

1838–1839 Tejano uprising in East Texas

- Part of Mexico-Texas conflicts and the Texas–Indian wars
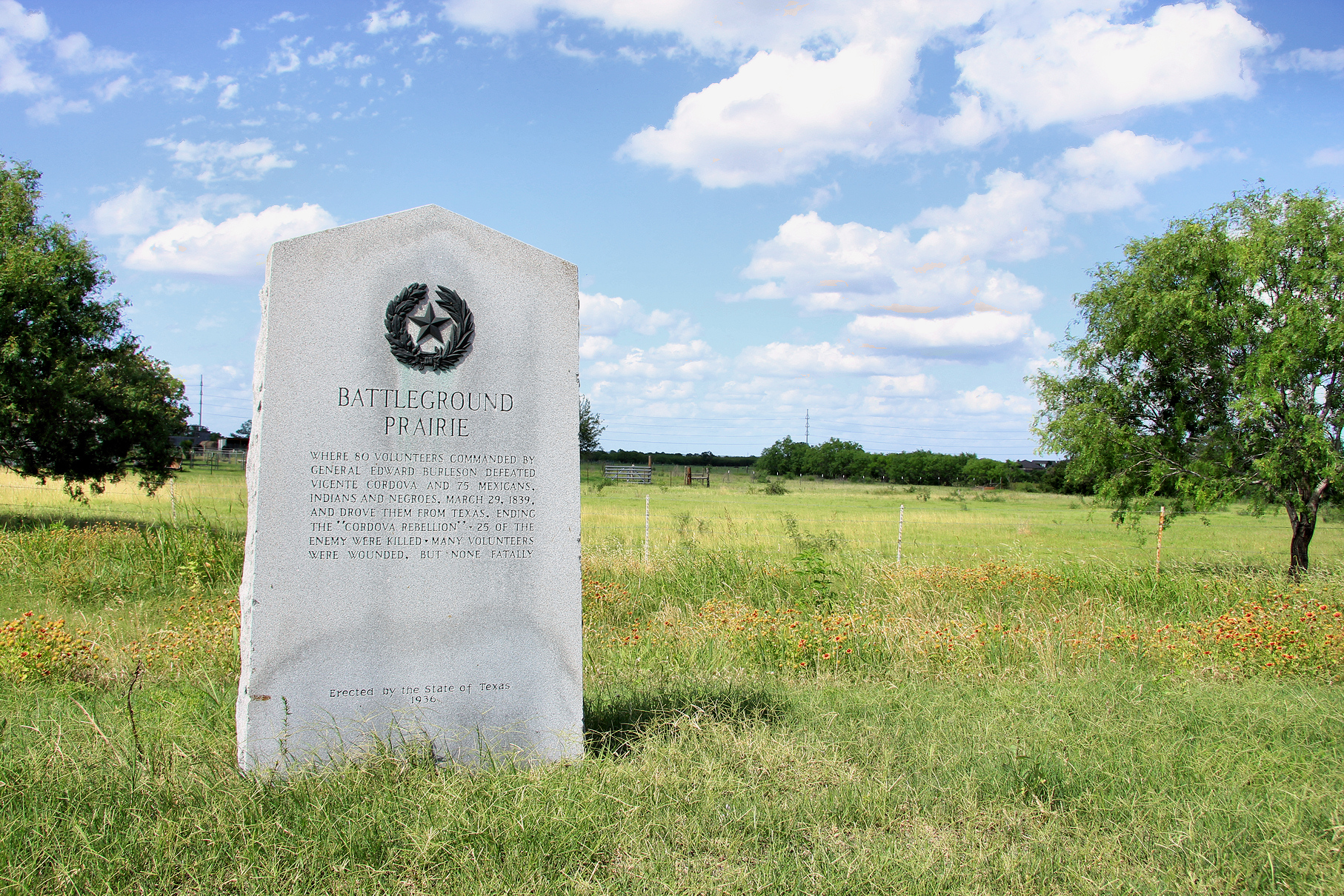
- Marker for the Battleground Prairie; site of the rebellion's last battle
| Date | August 1838 – March 1839 |
| Location | Nacogdoches, Republic of Texas |
| Result | Rebellion suppressed; captured documents used to justify Cherokee removal |

Belligerents
| Republic of Texas | Tejano loyalists Kickapoo |

Commanders and leaders
| Sam Houston; Thomas J. Rusk; Edward Burleson | Vicente Córdova (WIA) |

Strength
| ~600 militia | ~100 Tejano irregulars (limited Indian and regular Mexican support) |

Casualties and losses
| 3 killed | ~18–30 killed |

The Córdova Rebellion was an armed uprising in 1838–1839 against the Republic of Texas, centered in and around Nacogdoches. It was led by Vicente Córdova, a longtime Tejano official, together with other local Tejanos and limited Native American allies. The participants largely rejected full Texas independence and favored a return to Mexican federalism under the Constitution of 1824. The revolt was quickly contained but provided political pretext for later Cherokee removal under President Mirabeau B. Lamar.

== Background ==
Nacogdoches was a longstanding Tejano settlement dating to the late 18th century. Before 1836, residents of Hispanic descent formed the largest population segment. Rapid Anglo-American immigration after the Texas Revolution shifted political and economic control, raised disputes over land titles held by older Tejano families, and produced resentment. Córdova, former regidor, alcalde, and militia captain, like many others had supported Texas resistance to Mexico's shift to centralism while it aimed at restoring the 1824 federalist constitution rather than full separation from Mexico.

By late 1835–1836, Córdova was in contact with Mexican agents. Reports reached President Sam Houston of Mexican efforts to arrange with Cherokee leaders, including Chief Bowl for land titles in exchange for joint action. The Texas Senate had voided an earlier unratified Cherokee land agreement in 1837. Mexican agents were active in the region, seeking to encourage local Tejano and Indian resistance with promises of land titles.

== Rebellion ==
=== Angelina River skirmish ===
On 4 August 1838, Nacogdoches Texians searching for stolen horses were fired on by a party of Tejanos near the Angelina River, revealing a larger armed encampment. Reports indicated at least 100 men under Córdova. 1 Texian was killed and 2 prisoners later died in custody. On 8 August, Houston, then in Nacogdoches issued a proclamation banning unlawful assemblies and the carrying of arms, ordering people to disperse.

On 10 August, Córdova and eighteen other leaders issued a proclamation stating they were “tired of the injustice and the usurpation of their rights,” had taken up arms to sustain those rights and those of the nation to which they belonged, and were ready to “spill the last drop of their blood.” They asked only that their families not be molested. Some local Indians, primarily Kickapoo and smaller numbers of Shawnee, Lenape and Cherokees joined the band, though estimates of several hundred warriors appear inflated. Houston ordered restraint; Representative Thomas J. Rusk mobilized militia of about 600 men, disregarded orders not to cross the Angelina, and moved toward the Cherokee settlements of Chief Bowl. The rebels withdrew northwest, raided some outlying settlements, but secured no firm large-scale Indian commitment or major Mexican reinforcement, with only a few dozen soldiers dispatched from Matamoros.

=== Pursuit and Battleground Prairie ===
Córdova and remnants of the band, including some Mexican soldiers, fugitive slaves, and Indians moved south. On 29 March 1839, a company of about 80 men under General Edward Burleson defeated them near Seguin, Texas, at a site later called Battleground Prairie. Contemporary accounts report roughly 18–30 of Córdova’s group killed and several prisoners taken; Córdova was wounded but escaped toward Mexico, pursued by rangers under Mathew Caldwell.

== Aftermath ==
=== Trials ===
Thirty-three alleged participants, all with Spanish surnames, were arrested and indicted for treason in the Nacogdoches District Court. A change of venue to San Augustine County was granted for most because of local feeling. Only José Antonio Menchaca was convicted and sentenced to hang; the others were acquitted or had charges dismissed. Lamar pardoned Menchaca on 18 February 1839, four days before the scheduled execution noting that some former jurors later claimed they had been pressured.

=== Mexican agents, Cherokee removal and Tejano adaptation ===
Mexican agent Julián Pedro Miracle was killed near the Red River around 20 August 1838; papers on his body documented contacts with Cherokee leaders and claimed an agreement with Chief Bowl for coordinated action in exchange for land recognition. In May 1839, Texas Rangers defeated a party under Manuel Flores on the North San Gabriel River; documents recovered included letters from Mexican officials addressed to Córdova and Chief Bowl. When questioned, Cherokee leaders including Bowl denied involvement in the rebellion. Houston accepted the denials and continued to promise land titles; Lamar later used the papers as justification for demanding Cherokee departure. This contributed directly to the Cherokee War of 1839, the Battle of the Neches, the death of Chief Bowl, and the expulsion of Cherokee and associated groups from East Texas. By the mid-1840s, surviving Nacogdoches Tejanos largely accommodated Anglo dominance to retain property and community standing.

=== Related violence ===
In the months after the main Córdova uprising was suppressed, tensions between settlers and Indians in East Texas remained high. On 5 October 1838 a band attacked the Killough, Wood, and Williams families near present-day Larissa in Cherokee County. Eighteen settlers were killed or carried off in what became known as the Killough Massacre. Contemporary and later accounts linked the attack to the broader hostility that followed the Córdova Rebellion and the Texas Senate’s rejection of the 1836 Cherokee land agreement. The precise composition of the attacking party is uncertain; some reports described a mixed group that may have included Indians, Mexicans, and fugitive eslaves.

=== Kickapoo migration ===
The combination of the Rebellion, related frontier violence, and Lamar’s removal policy led most Kickapoo in East Texas to leave by 1839, with many going to Mexico or Indian Territory. In Mexico, they align with the Mexican military and served as raiders into Texas and as border sentinels.

=== Córdova's later career ===
Córdova reached Mexico. He returned in September 1842 with General Adrián Woll’s force that briefly occupied San Antonio. He was killed on 18 September 1842 during the Battle of Salado Creek.

== See also ==
- Texas-Indian Wars
- Timeline of the Republic of Texas
- Cherokee history
- Adrián Woll
