= Assembly of Notables (Mexico) =

Assembly of Notables Asamblea de Notables
- Second Mexican Empire

History
- Founded: 8 July 1863
- Disbanded: 19 June 1867
- Preceded by: Supreme Governing Junta (Conservative Party)
- Succeeded by: Congress of the Union (Liberal Party)

Leadership
- President: Teodosio Lares
- Secretaries: • Alejandro Arango y Escandón • José María Andrade
- Seats: 215

The Assembly of Notables was a governmental body recognized by the Conservative Party that functioned as a Legislative Power convened by the Supreme Governing Junta. It was composed of 215 members chosen from Mexican citizens of diverse classes and ranks, serving as departmental representatives. Their task was to decide the definitive form of government and, once that decision was made, to offer the Mexican throne to the Austrian archduke Maximilian of Habsburg under a moderate hereditary monarchy.

== Members ==
- Art. 1. The Supreme Governing Junta, established in accordance with the decree of the 18th of the present month, has proceeded to the election of the two hundred and fifteen individuals who are to constitute the Assembly of Notables, as provided in Article 10 of the decree of the 16th of the same month, and the following persons were appointed:
- Art. 2. The Assembly shall be convened on the 8th day of the coming month of July.

== List of Representatives of the Assembly of Notables ==
Representative	Background	Department
1. Acevedo D. Mariano	Deputy, Treasury official	Guanajuato
2. Adalid D. José	Landowner, farmer, councillor	Mexico
3. Agea D. Ramón	Engineer, current alderman	Sonora
4. Aguilar D. Bruno	Artillery general and governor	Jalisco
5. Alvarado D. Ignacio	Professor of medicine	Mexico
6. Álvarez D. Manuel	Landowner and farmer	Mexico
7. Alvear D. José María	Landowner, merchant, and alderman	Mexico
8. Anievas D. José Ignacio	Undersecretary of the Interior	Querétaro
9. Alamán D. Juan B.	Lawyer and landowner	Guanajuato
10. Arias y Ozta D. Juan	Landowner and councillor	Mexico
11. Azcárate D. Miguel María	Landowner, councillor, and governor	Mexico
12. Barrera D. Ignacio de la	Customs administrator	Querétaro
13. Berganzo D. Manuel	Physician and professor	Mexico
14. Barandiarán D. Gregorio	Diplomat	Morelia
15. Barragán D. Mariano	Silversmith	Querétaro
16. Bejarano D. Pedro	Lawyer	Zacatecas
17. Blanco D. Miguel	General, governor	Yucatán
18. Boneta D. Ignacio	Judge, magistrate	Mexico
19. Bucheli D. Manuel	Treasury official	Mexico
20. Bringas D. José María	Landowner	Veracruz
21. Cagide D. Jesús	Painter	Mexico
22. Campos D. Mariano	Treasury official	Mexico
23. Carpena D. Agustín	Abbot of Guadalupe	Querétaro
24. Carbajal D. Vicente	Landowner, official, councillor	Veracruz
25. Castillo y Cos D. Joaquín	Treasury official	Veracruz
26. Casasola D. José María	Lawyer, court prosecutor	Mexico
27. Carranza D. Ignacio	General, landowner, industrialist	Jalisco
28. Cervantes D. Javier	Landowner, lawyer, alderman	Mexico
29. Cervantes y Estanillo D. Juan	Diplomat	Mexico
30. Cordero D. Manuel	Landowner, lawyer, judge	Mexico
31. Contreras D. Mariano	Lawyer, judge, magistrate	San Luis
32. Contreras D. Trinidad	Shoemaker	Mexico
33. Cosío D. Francisco	General, landowner	Nuevo León
34. Cueva D. José Ramón	Landowner, notary	Mexico
35. Cuevas D. Luis G.	Senator, councillor, minister, diplomat	Mexico
36. Cuevas D. Santiago	General	Colima
37. Crespo D. Antonio	Former official	Puebla
38. Cosío D. Miguel González	Landowner, lawyer, alderman	Mexico
39. Castillo D. Dionisio	Lawyer, official	Jalisco
40. Dávila D. Mariano	Clergyman, institute director	Mexico
41. Díaz de la Vega D. Rómulo	General, governor, former President of Mexico	Yucatán
42. Duarte D. José Mariano	Deputy, councillor, magistrate	Puebla
43. Durán D. José María	Undersecretary of Justice	Mexico
44. Echave D. Manuel	Landowner, alderman	Puebla
45. Echave D. Juan	Landowner	Mexico
46. Echeverría D. Antonio	Landowner, farmer, merchant	Veracruz
47. Elguero D. Hilario	Lawyer, judge, councillor, minister	Veracruz
48. Elguero D. Pedro	Lawyer, fiscal agent, alderman	Veracruz
49. Escudero y Echanove D. Pedro	Lawyer, deputy, farmer	Yucatán
50. Esparza D. Ignacio	Engineer Corps colonel	Zacatecas
51. Esparza Macías D. José María	Lawyer, magistrate	Aguascalientes
52. Espinosa D. Rafael	General, deputy, governor	Californias
53. Escalante D. Felipe	Industrialist, alderman	Durango
54. Fernández del Castillo D. Pedro	Official, minister, diplomat	Guanajuato
55. Fernández de Jáuregui D. Manuel	Deputy, councillor, minister	Querétaro
56. Fernández D. Mariano	General	Veracruz
57. Flores D. Juan María	Deputy, landowner, governor	Mexico
58. Flores D. Joaquín	Landowner, councillor	Mexico
59. Flores Alatorre D. Mariano	Lawyer, landowner	Puebla
60. Flores Alatorre D. Agustín	Landowner, lawyer, councillor	Mexico
61. Fonseca D. Urbano	Landowner, lawyer, magistrate	Mexico
62. Frauenfeld D. José	Landowner, farmer, alderman	Mexico
63. Galicia Chimalpopoca D. Faustino	Professor, lawyer, magistrate	Tlaxcala
64. Galván Rivera D. Mariano	Industrialist	Mexico
65. Garay y Tejada D. José	Landowner, alderman, Secretary of Government	Mexico
66. Gardida D. Tomás	Merchant, alderman	Veracruz
67. Gárate D. Bernardo	Deputy, councillor, capitular vicar	Querétaro
68. García D. Juan	Merchant	Mexico
69. García Vargas D. Miguel	Landowner, deputy	Colima
70. García Aguirre D. Manuel	Lawyer, alderman, judge, prefect, magistrate	Mexico
71. García Arcos D. Javier	Landowner, alderman, prefect	Mexico
72. Gómez de Lamadrid D. Juan Francisco	Landowner	Sonora
73. González de la Vega D. José María	Landowner, magistrate, diplomat	Mexico
74. González D. Luciano	Official	Aguascalientes
75. González D. José Hipólito	Landowner, colonel	Veracruz
76. Guimbarda D. Bernardo	Deputy, councillor, magistrate	Nuevo León
77. Güitián D. Alejandro	Official	Nuevo León
78. Gutiérrez D. Francisco	Silversmith	Mexico
79. Germán D. Diego	Lawyer	Mexico
80. Haro D. Pedro	Alderman, licensed broker	Jalisco
81. Hebromar D. Mariano	Merchant	Mexico
82. Hernández D. Severiano	Painter	Tlaxcala
83. Hidalgo Carpio D. Luis	Professor of medicine	San Luis
84. Hidalgo D. Juan	Former official	Mexico
85. Hoz D. Manuel de la	Lawyer, landowner	Jalisco
86. Huici D. Luis	Undersecretary of the Treasury, councillor	Mexico
87. Icaza y Mora D. Mariano	Lawyer, judge, alderman	Mexico
88. Yáñez D. Mariano	Landowner, lawyer, deputy, minister	Guanajuato
89. Icazbalceta D. Mariano García	Landowner, farmer, alderman	Mexico
90. Iglesias D. Francisco	War commissary, official	Sonora
91. Iturbide D. Agustín	Diplomat, eldest son of former Emperor Agustín de Iturbide	Michoacán
92. Jiménez D. Ismael	Clergyman and professor of law	Puebla
93. Jorrín D. Pedro	Landowner, councillor, minister	Guanajuato
94. Lama D. Gerónimo	Licensed broker	Veracruz
95. Landa D. Luis	Merchant, alderman	Mexico
96. Larraínzar D. Manuel	Landowner, deputy, senator	Chiapas
97. Lara D. Mariano	Industrialist, official	Mexico
98. Laspita D. Antonio	Director of the Montepío	Querétaro
99. Lascurain D. Francisco	Landowner, merchant, alderman	Veracruz
100. Lomelín D. Manuel	Presbyter, landowner	Jalisco
101. Madrid D. Germán	Alderman, lawyer	Mexico
102. Malo D. José Ramón	Deputy, senator, councillor	Michoacán
103. Martínez D. José Guadalupe	Undersecretary of the Interior	Tabasco
104. Marroquín D. Joaquín	Colonel, governor	Tabasco
105. Madrigal D. Jorge	Landowner, former official	Veracruz
106. Manero D. José Hipólito	Consul	Oaxaca
107. Márquez D. Leonardo	General, governor	Jalisco
108. Marrón D. Ramón	Industrialist	Puebla
109. Melé D. Francisco	Medical director	Sinaloa
110. Mejía D. Tomás	General, governor	Querétaro
111. Mendoza D. Antonio	Weaver	Tlaxcala
112. Miranda D. Rafael	Treasury official	Tlaxcala
113. Mier y Terán D. Joaquín	Professor of mathematics	Jalisco
114. Montes de Oca D. Manuel	Piano manufacturer	Colima
115. Morales D. José	Sharpshooter	Aguascalientes
116. Moreno D. Manuel	Landowner, dean of the Cathedral	Mexico
117. Morán D. Antonino	Alderman, landowner	Mexico
118. Mora y Ozta D. Luis	Lawyer, alderman	Mexico
119. Mora y Ozta D. Manuel	Diplomat	Mexico
120. Mora D. Francisco Serapio	Diplomat	Tamaulipas
121. Monroy D. José López	Treasury official	Zacatecas
122. Medina D. José María	Landowner, director of San Andrés Hospital	Mexico
123. Muñoz D. Luis	Landowner, physician, alderman	Mexico
124. Murphy D. Patricio	Alderman, professor	Veracruz
125. Noriega D. Manuel	General, governor	Durango
126. Nájera D. Domingo	Prefect	Querétaro
127. Nieto D. José María	Landowner, Archdeacon of Guadalajara	Jalisco
128. Núñez D. Gabriel	Treasury official, landowner	Veracruz
129. Ovando D. José	Landowner	Puebla
130. Ochoa D. José María	Lawyer, clergyman	Mexico
131. Olloqui D. José	Landowner	Mexico
132. Orozco D. José Cayetano	Deputy, canon	Jalisco
133. Orozco y Berra D. Manuel	Undersecretary of Development	Querétaro
134. Ortiz Cervantes D. Joaquín	Landowner, industrialist	Mexico
135. Pacheco D. José Miguel	Deputy, councillor, landowner	Jalisco
136. Pacheco D. Pantaleón	Treasury official	Jalisco
137. Pagaza D. José	Landowner, official	Mexico
138. Pastor D. Juan N.	Lawyer, fiscal agent	Querétaro
139. Paredes y Arrillaga D. Agustín	Landowner, alderman	Mexico
140. Paredes y Arrillaga D. José María	Lawyer, judge	Mexico
141. Paredes y Castillo D. Mariano	Lawyer, judge	Mexico
142. Parón D. Francisco González	General	San Luis
143. Pereda D. Juan N.	Diplomat	Mexico
144. Pérez D. Francisco	Landowner, general, governor	Puebla
145. Peña y Santiago D. Mariano	Landowner, merchant	Mexico
146. Peña D. José	Landowner, alderman	Querétaro
147. Pérez Marín D. Fernando	Landowner	Puebla
148. Piedra D. José María	Lawyer, alderman, landowner	Mexico
149. Piquero D. Ignacio	Deputy, councillor, official	Tlaxcala
150. Piña y Cuevas D. Manuel	Landowner, councillor, minister	Department of Mexico
151. Piña D. Miguel	Artillery general	Chiapas
152. Portilla D. Nicolás	General, governor	Chihuahua
153. Pliego D. Jesús	Landowner, farmer	Mexico
154. Primo Rivera D. Joaquín	Clergyman, landowner	Mexico
155. Querejazu D. Pascual	Landowner, physician	Guanajuato
156. Quiñones D. José	Landowner	Oaxaca
157. Rada D. Agustín	Clergyman	San Luis
158. Raigosa D. Felipe	Undersecretary of the Interior	Zacatecas
159. Ramírez D. Francisco	Bishop of Caradro	Guanajuato
160. Ramírez D. José Fernando	Deputy, senator, minister, magistrate	Durango
161. Rebollar D. Rafael	Lawyer, judge, magistrate	Durango
162. Riva Palacio D. Mariano	Deputy, senator, governor, minister	Mexico
163. Roa Bárcena D. José María	Public writer	Veracruz
164. Rodríguez Osio D. Mariano	Former official	Sinaloa
165. Río de la Loza D. Leopoldo	Industrialist	Mexico
166. Rosales y Alcalde D. Manuel	Lawyer, magistrate, landowner	Mexico
167. Rodríguez Villanueva D. José María	Lawyer, justice official	Oaxaca
168. Robles D. Carlos	Landowner, miner, alderman	Guanajuato
169. Rodríguez de San Miguel D. Juan N.	Deputy, councillor, landowner	Puebla
170. Robleda D. Felipe	Merchant, alderman	Veracruz
171. Ruiz D. José María	Former Treasury official	Veracruz
172. Rubiños D. Juan Felipe	Lawyer	Oaxaca
173. Rus D. José Francisco	Diplomat	Oaxaca
174. Russi D. José Román	Development Ministry official	Tamaulipas
175. Ruiz D. Luis	Landowner	Veracruz
176. Salazar D. Hipólito	Lithographer	Oaxaca
177. Salazar Ilarregui D. José	Alderman, engineer	Chihuahua
178. Salcido D. Francisco de P.	General	Jalisco
179. Sardaneta D. José María	Marquis of Rayas, miner	Guanajuato
180. Sánchez D. Fernando	Director of contributions	Morelia
181. Sánchez Castro D. Pedro	Lawyer, magistrate	Durango
182. Samaniego D. Desiderio	Landowner	Querétaro
183. Sánchez Villavicencio D. Juan	Merchant	Colima
184. Sainz Herosa D. José M.	Canon, lawyer	Veracruz
185. Serrano D. José Rafael	Lawyer	Puebla
186. Segura D. Sebastián	Deputy, assayer	Veracruz
187. Segura D. Vicente	Deputy, councillor, official	Veracruz
188. Solares D. Ignacio	Lawyer, judge	Durango
189. Sánchez Facio D. José	Colonel	Veracruz
190. Sota Riva D. Manuel	Landowner, governor, official	Mexico
191. Solórzano D. Joaquín	General	Sinaloa
192. Tagle D. Francisco	Landowner, official	Mexico
193. Terán D. Ignacio	Merchant	Mexico
194. Torres Larraínzar D. Joaquín	Landowner, prefect	Puebla
195. Tort D. José María	Physician	Puebla
196. Tornel D. Agustín	Alderman, official	Puebla
197. Trujillo D. Ignacio	Lawyer, merchant, farmer	Chiapas
198. Ulibarri D. José Dolores	Landowner, official, diplomat	Mexico
199. Uriarte D. Manuel	Landowner, prefect	Puebla
200. Valle D. Manuel	Landowner, merchant	Oaxaca
201. Valenzuela D. Francisco	Official	Aguascalientes
202. Vértiz D. Juan N.	Lawyer, judge, deputy, councillor	Querétaro
203. Velasco D. Fernando A.	General	Zacatecas
204. Velázquez de la Cadena D. Joaquín	Official	San Luis
205. Villaurrutia D. Ramón	Landowner, lawyer	Mexico
206. Vicario D. Juan	General, governor	Mexico
207. Villalón D. Francisco	Landowner, notary	Michoacán
208. Villaurrutia D. Eulogio	Landowner	Mexico
209. Villar y Bocanegra D. José María	Landowner, judge, magistrate, senator	Aguascalientes
210. Villar y Bocanegra D. Francisco	Clergyman	Aguascalientes
211. Villavicencio D. Francisco	Lawyer, magistrate	Tamaulipas
212. Viya y Cosío D. Hermenegildo	Deputy, senator, councillor, merchant	Veracruz
213. Zaldívar D. José María	Lawyer, judge, minister	Mexico
214. Zavala D. Manuel	General	Tamaulipas
215. Zimbrón D. Manuel Díaz	Landowner, lawyer, deputy, judge	Mexico

== Mexican Delegation ==
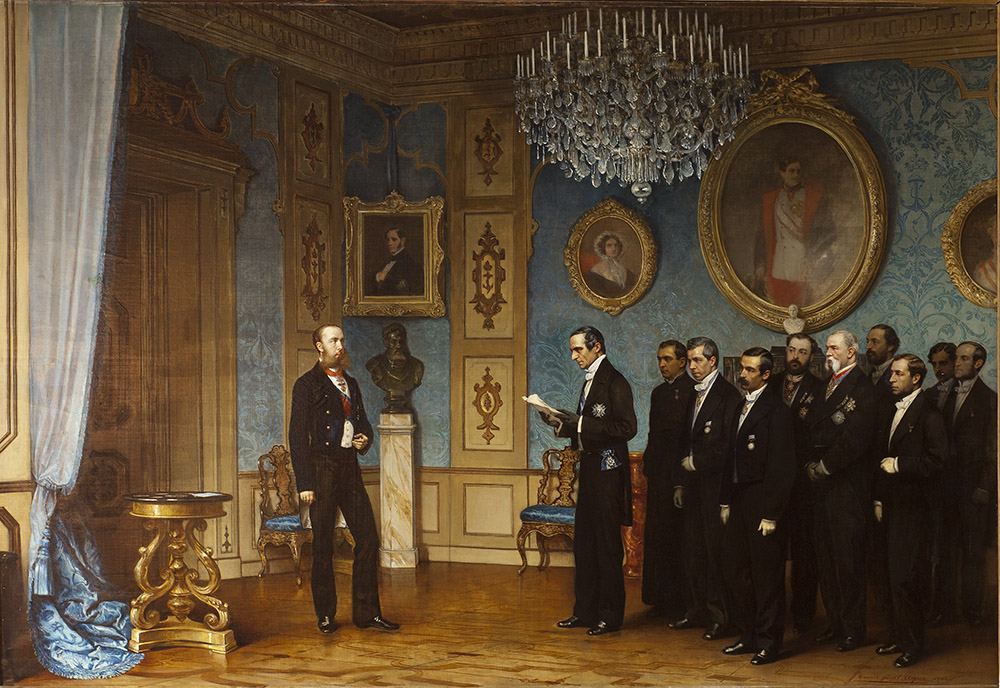
At Miramare Castle, the Mexican Delegation appoints Ferdinand Maximilian of Habsburg as Emperor of Mexico by Cesare Dell'Acqua (1864)

The Assembly of Notables appointed a Mexican Delegation tasked with offering the Mexican throne to His Majesty Maximilian of Habsburg as representatives of the nation.

Delegate	Background
Mr. José María Gutiérrez de Estrada; President	Former Minister of Interior and Foreign Affairs
Mr. Ángel Iglesias Domínguez; Secretary	Ophthalmologist and otorhinolaryngologist
Mr. Joaquín Velázquez de León	Former Minister of War and the Navy, of Development, and of State
Mr. Ignacio Águilar Marocho	Former Minister of Justice
Mr. Francisco Javier Miranda	Former Minister of Justice and Ecclesiastical Affairs
Mr. José Manuel Hidalgo y Esnaurrízar	Former Chargé d’Affaires
Mr. Antonio Suárez de Peredo	Count of the Valley
Mr. José María de Landa	Landowner
Mr. Antonio Escandón	Entrepreneur
Mr. Adrián Woll	Military officer

== See also ==
- First Mexican Empire
- Second French intervention in Mexico
- Imperial Crown of Mexico
- Emperor of Mexico
- Mexican Imperial Orders
- Nationalist Front of Mexico
- Cabinet of Maximilian I of Mexico
