= Imperial Order of the Mexican Eagle =

Mexican Imperial order

Imperial Order of the Mexican Eagle Orden Imperial del Águila Mexicana
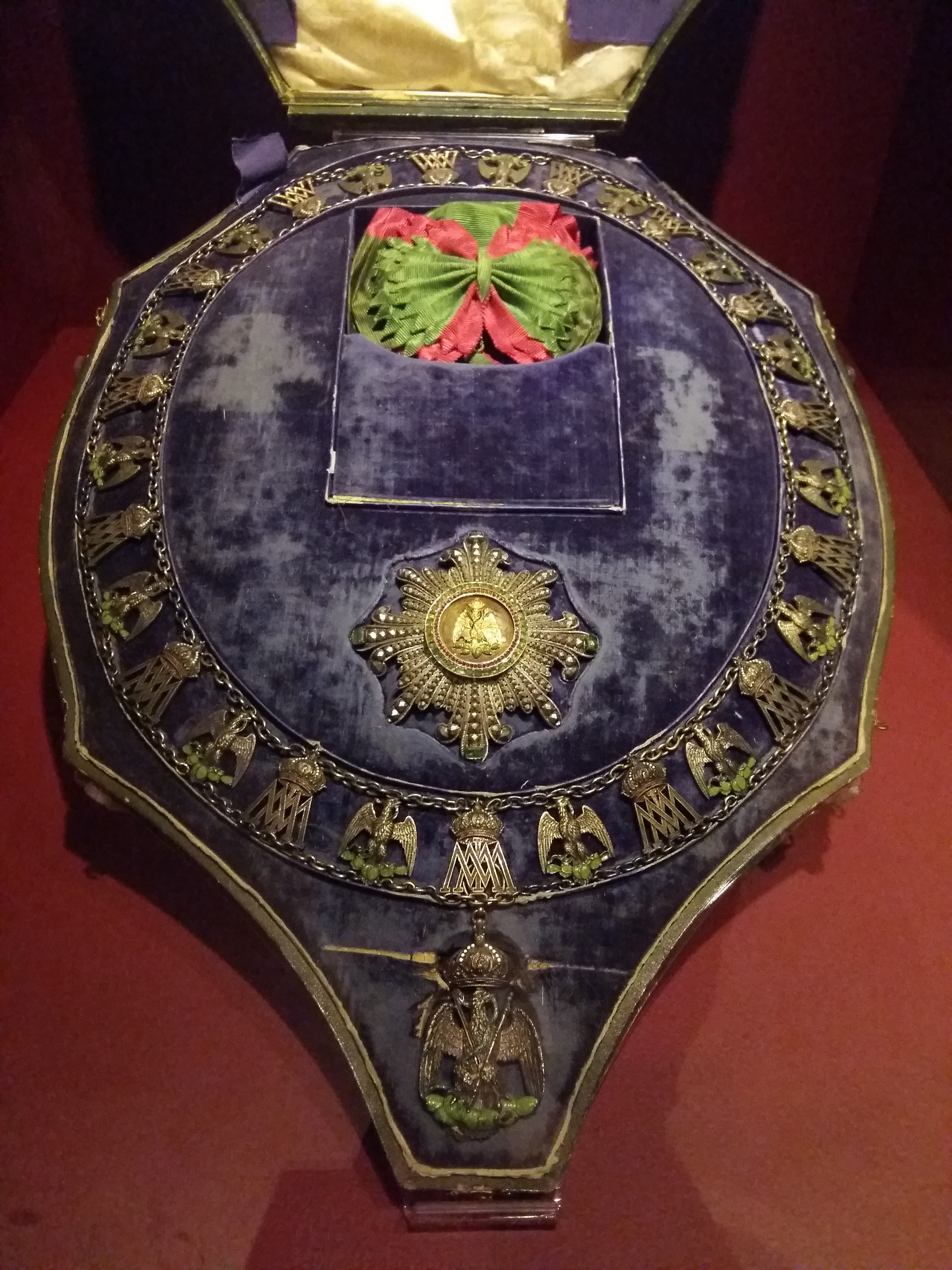
- Collar of the order in its case

Awarded by Maximilian I, the Emperor of Mexico
- Type: Chivralic Order
- Established: January 1st, 1865
- Country: Second Mexican Empire
- Motto: "Equidad en la justicia"
- Eligibility: Military, civilian
- Awarded for: Meritorious Service or Achievement
- Founder: Maximilian I of Mexico
- Chairman of the Council: Juan Nepomuceno Almonte
- Grades: Knight Grand Cross; Grand Officer; Commander; Officer; Knight

Precedence
- Next (higher): None, highest merit
- Next (lower): Imperial Order of Guadalupe
- Ribbon bar

The Imperial Order of the Mexican Eagle was an order of chivalry created by emperor Maximilian I of Mexico during the Second Mexican Empire on 1 January 1865. It was one of three Mexican Imperial Orders. It survives partly in name as the Order of the Aztec Eagle.

The order was established as an award for extraordinary merits and services to the state and ruler, for outstanding civil or military service, and outstanding achievements in the fields of science and art. It was considered the highest and most exclusive award during the Second Mexican Empire.

The coat of arms of the Second Mexican Empire with the chain and insignia of the order hanging below.

It was also utilized in an effort to reach prestige among European monarchies, in order to obtain concessions and diplomatic recognition for the new Mexican Empire.

== History ==
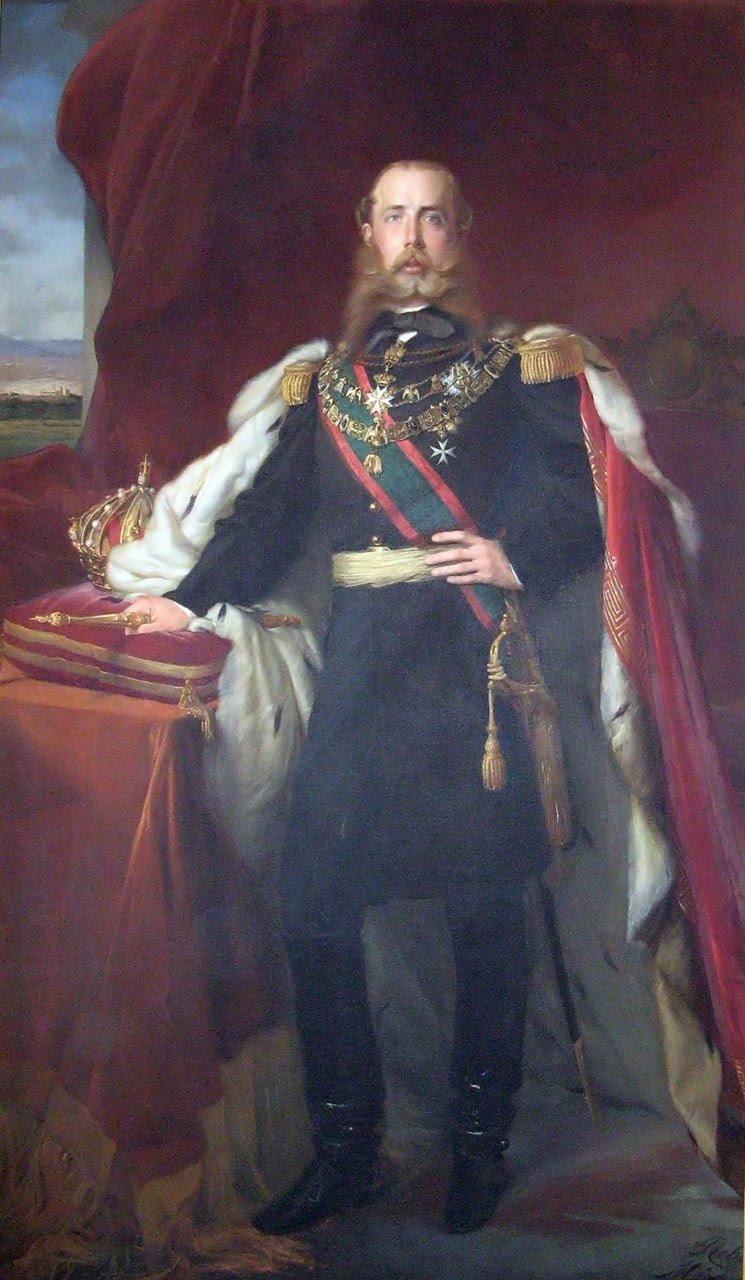
Emperor Maximilian wearing the collar and sash of the Imperial Order of the Mexican Eagle, portrait by Santiago Rebull (1865)

Emperor Maximilian I gave priority to the Imperial Order of the Mexican Eagle over the Order of Guadalupe, and the chain of the order was placed on the imperial arms of the empire. He omitted the chain of the old Order of Guadalupe, which the emperor Agustín established in 1822, and president Antonio López de Santa Anna later restored.

== Insignia ==
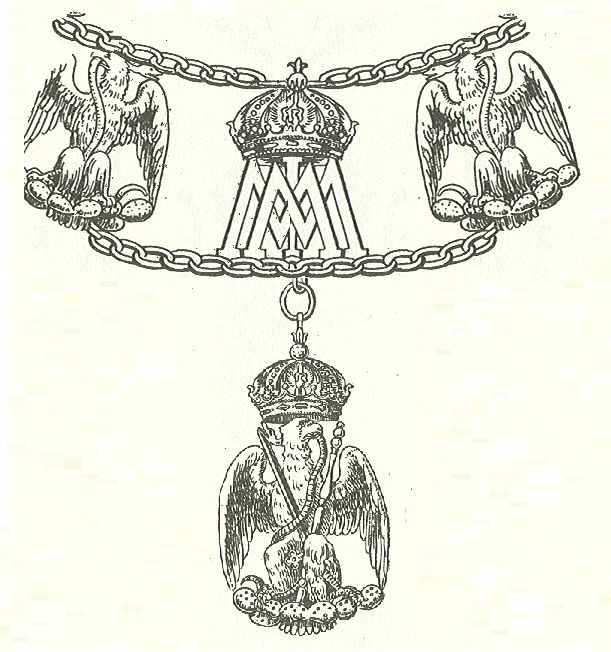
Collar and insignia of the Imperial Order of the Mexican Eagle

The insignia of the order was composed of an eagle atop a nopal devouring a serpent, which made reference to the Mexican national arms, and crowned with the Imperial Crown of Mexico.

The plaque, or star, reserved for the first three classes contained a crowned Mexican eagle surrounded by green and red stones as a medallion in the center. The ribbon and sash were green with red edges.

The chain, or necklace, was gold and interspersed in the links was the monogram of its founder (MIM) and the coat of arms of the Second Mexican Empire.

== Classes ==
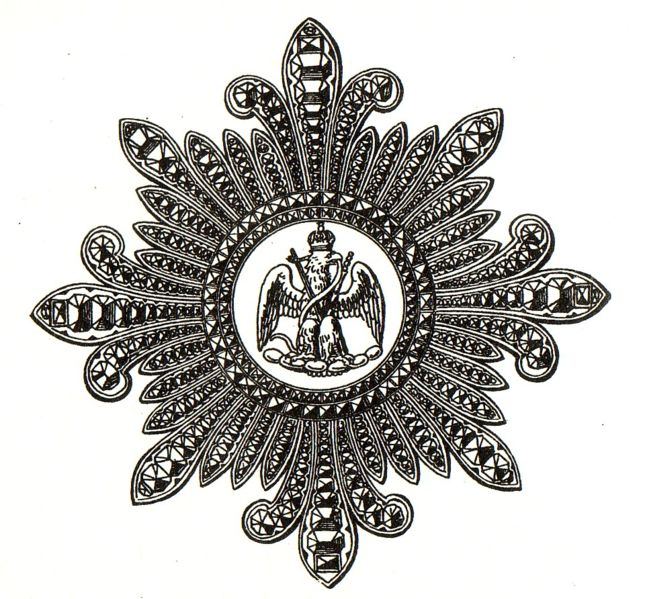
Plaque, or star, of the order

Unlike the Austrian orders that Maximilian had come to know in his youth in Vienna, a habit of the order was not provided. The order could be bestowed on both Mexicans and foreigners. The number of concessions was limited for Mexicans, but unlimited in all degrees for foreigners. The chain, or necklace, was reserved for reigning monarchs.

It consisted of two classes: the First Class only available to Heads of State, awarded a Grand Cross with Collar; and the Ordinary Class. The order consisted of the following ranks:

- Collar (12)

Worn with the insignia on a gold collar, the sash over the right shoulder to the left hip, and plaque on the left breast.

- Grand Cross (25)

Worn as a band over the right shoulder to the left hip and the badge on the left chest.

- Grand Officer (50)

Worn as a ribbon with the insignia hanging around their necks and the badge on their right chest.

- Commander (100)

Worn as a ribbon with the insignia hanging around their necks.

- Officer (200)

Worn as a badge on a rosetted ribbon, hung on the left chest

- Knight (ilimitados)

Worn as the insignia on a ribbon without a rosette, hung on the left breast.

== Post-Imperial ==
After the execution of emperor Maximilian I and the re-establishment of the Juárez regime, the imperial decorations, like many decrees of the emperor, were abolished. However, some of the people awarded this merit continued to carry it as a sign of loyalty to the emperor and the empire until their death.

== Gallery ==
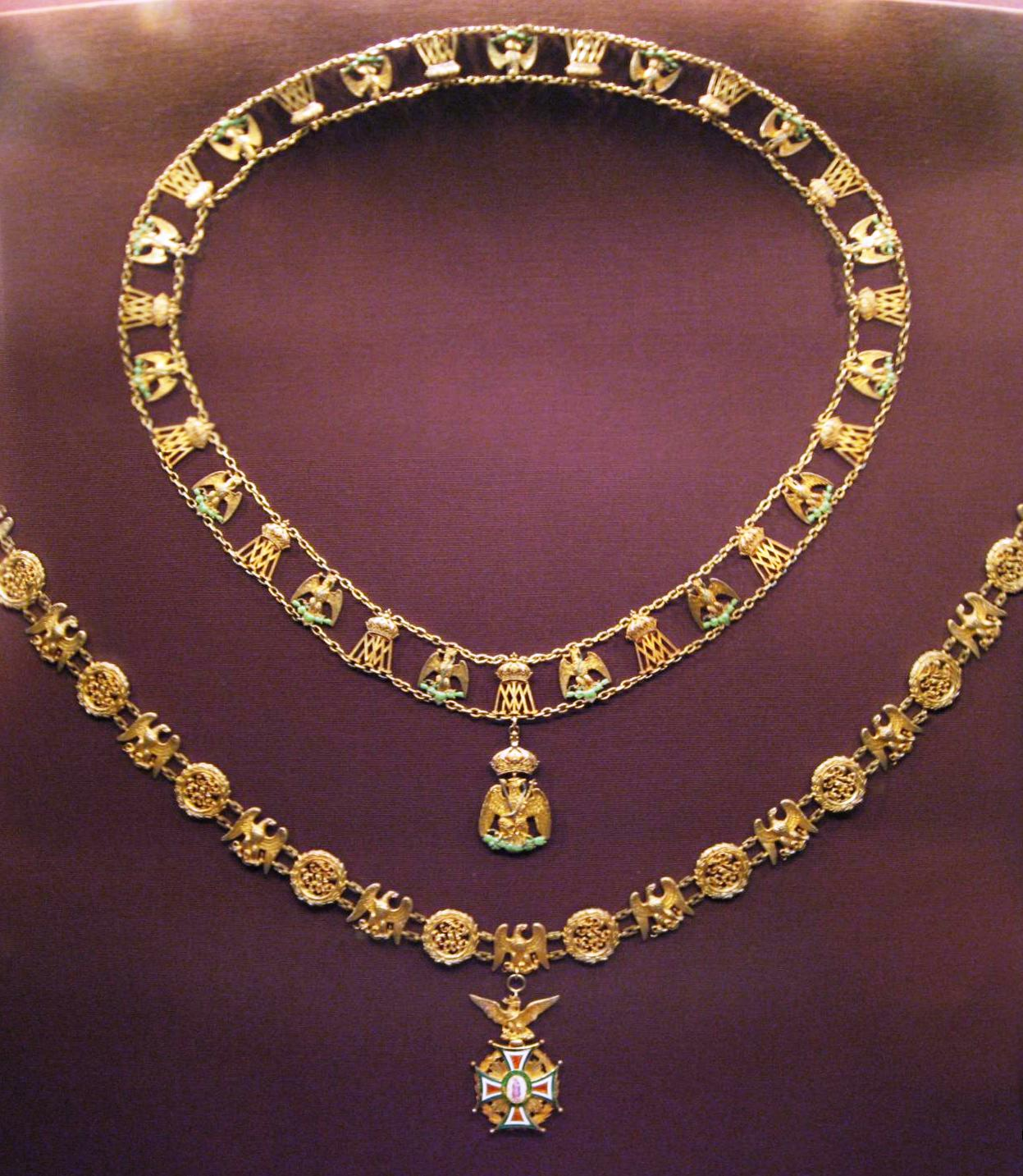
Collars of the Order of Guadalupe and the Imperial Order of the Mexican Eagle

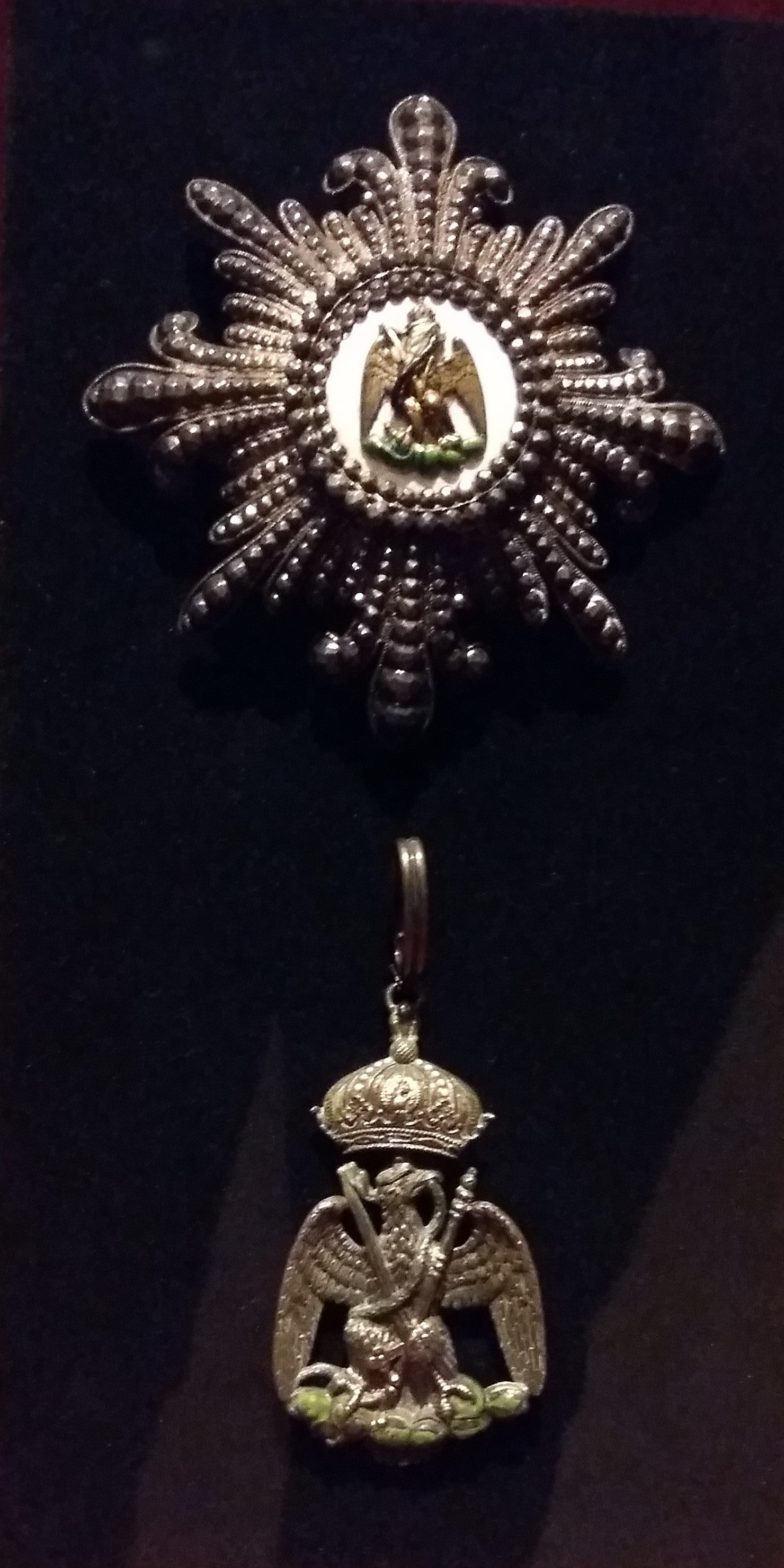
Plaque, or star, and insignia of the Imperial Order of the Mexican Eagle

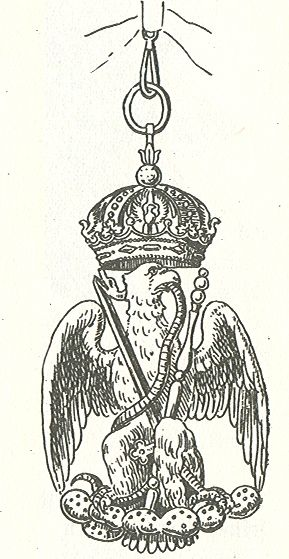
Drawing of the design for the veneration of the order

Neck Ribbon of the Comendador of the Order of the Mexican Eagle

== Insignia ==
Insignia of the Imperial Order of the Mexican Eagle
Grand Cross with Collar	Sash Grand Cross with Collar Grand Cross	Star Grand Cross with Collar Grand Cross Grand Officer	Necklet Grand Officer Commander	Medal Officer	Medal Knight
