= Mexican Imperial Orders =

Orders of chivalry

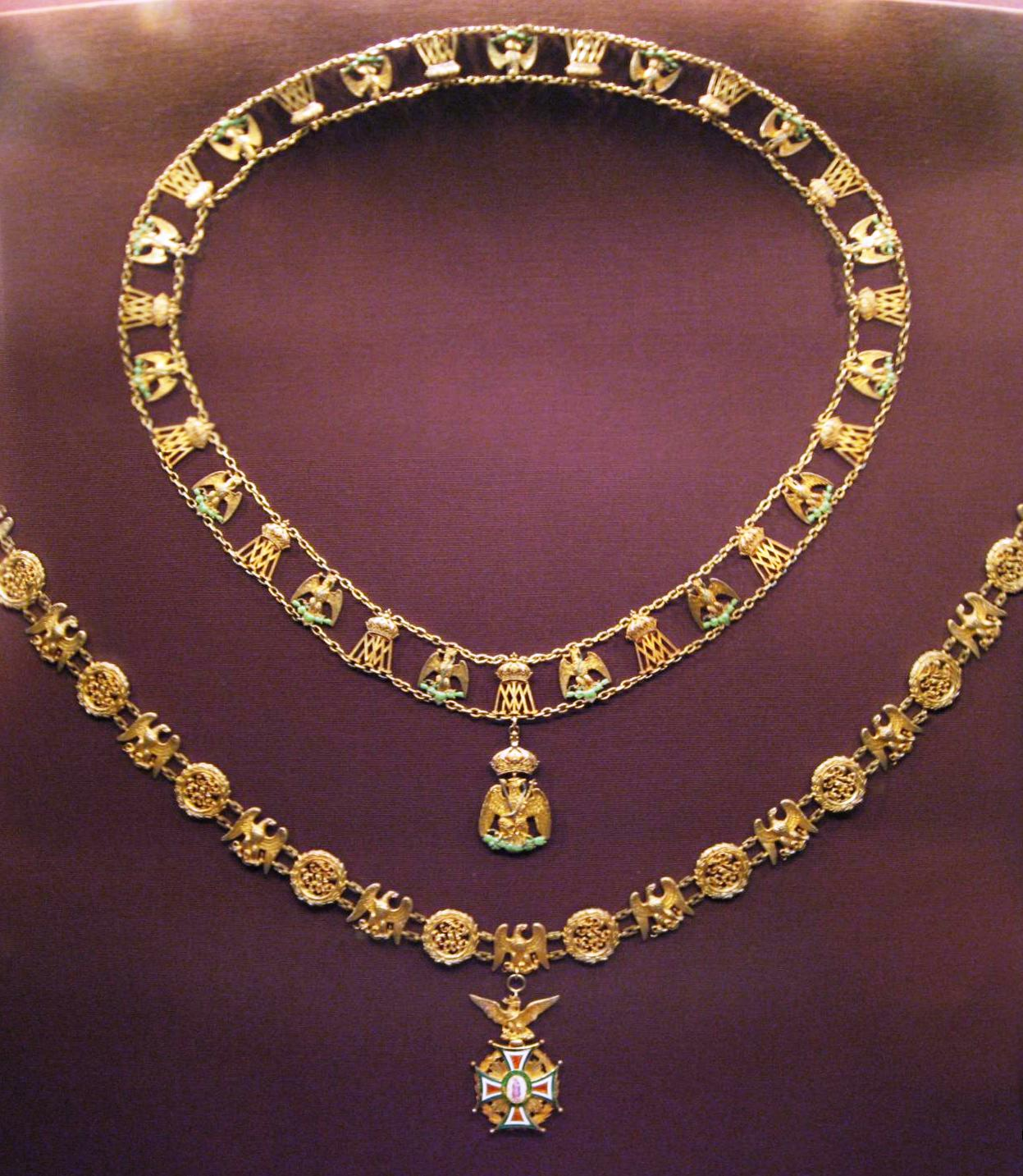
Chains of the Order of Our Lady of Guadalupe (below) and of the Order of the Mexican Eagle

There were three Imperial Orders of the Mexican Empire, which were Orders of chivalry created to reward Heads of state and prominent people during the two periods of the Mexican Empire — the Imperial Order of Guadalupe (Spanish: Orden Imperial de Guadalupe), the Imperial Order of the Mexican Eagle (Spanish: Orden Imperial del Águila Mexicana), and the Imperial Order of Saint Charles (Spanish: Imperial Orden de San Carlos).

== Imperial Order of Guadalupe ==
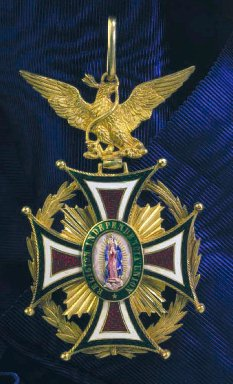
Cross of "National Order of Our Lady of Guadalupe"

- (1822–1823, 1853–1855)
- (1863–1867)

The Order of Guadalupe (originally: "National Order of Our Lady of Guadalupe") was established by Emperor Agustín I of Mexico in the autumn of 1821, although its statutes would not be published until February 1822. It was originally divided into two classes: Grand Cross and Numerary Member. After the abdication and death of Emperor Agustin I, the Order fell out of use and remained inactive for 30 years until Antonio López de Santa Anna convinced Pope Pius IX to recognize it in 1854. It fell into disuse again in August of that same year after the successful Ayutla Revolution and the ousting of Santa Anna from government. The third and last period of the Order began on June 30, 1863, before the arrival of Maximilian I of Mexico, by decree of the Provisional Imperial Government.

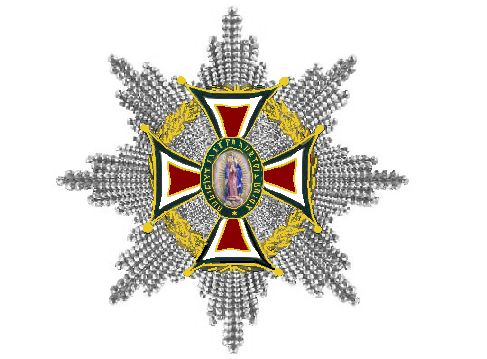
Star of the Order of Guadalupe

Emperor Maximilian I modified the statutes of the Order for the last time on April 10, 1865, renaming the order "Imperial" (instead of "National") and divided it into four ranks, each with civilian and military divisions:

- Grand Cross, limited to 30 recipients.
- Grand Officer, limited to 100 recipients.
- Commander, limited to 200 recipients.
- Knight, limited to 500 recipients.

Recipients of the Imperial Order of Guadalupe

Grand Crosses

- François Achille Bazaine
- Carlota of Mexico
- Frederick III, German Emperor
- Gabino Gaínza
- Alexander Gorchakov
- Alexander von Humboldt
- Isabella II of Spain
- Salvador de Iturbide y Marzán
- Agustín Jerónimo de Iturbide y Huarte
- Kamehameha V
- Leopold I of Belgium
- Richard von Metternich
- Napoleon III
- Napoléon, Prince Imperial
- Queen Victoria

Grand Officers
Commanders

- Louis Antoine Debrauz de Saldapenna
- Ludwig von Fautz

Knights

- Luigi Calori
- Vicente Filísola

Unknown Classes

- Vicente Guerrero
- Agustín de Iturbide
- Gustave Léon Niox
- Wilhelm von Tegetthoff

== Imperial Order of the Mexican Eagle ==
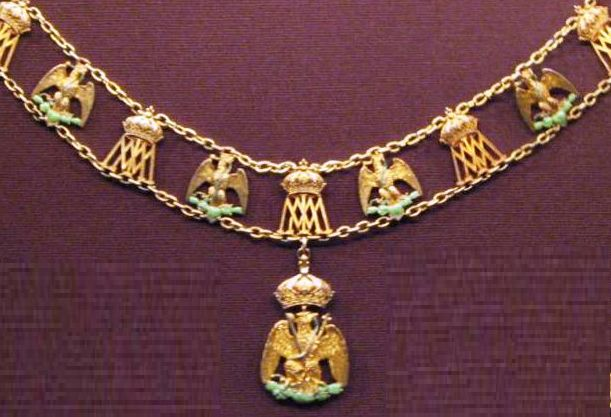
Detail of the chain of the Imperial Order of the Mexican Eagle

- The Imperial Order of the Mexican Eagle was created by Maximilian I on January 1, 1865. It consisted of two classes: the Superior Class only available to Heads of State, awarded a Grand Cross with Collar; and the Ordinary Class, consisting of the following ranks:
- Grand Cross
- Grand Officer
- Commander
- Officer
- Knight

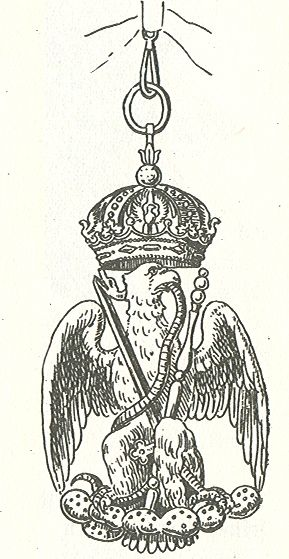
Drawing of the order insignia

The award survives partially (in name at least) in the modern Mexican Order of the Aztec Eagle.

== Imperial Order of Saint Charles ==
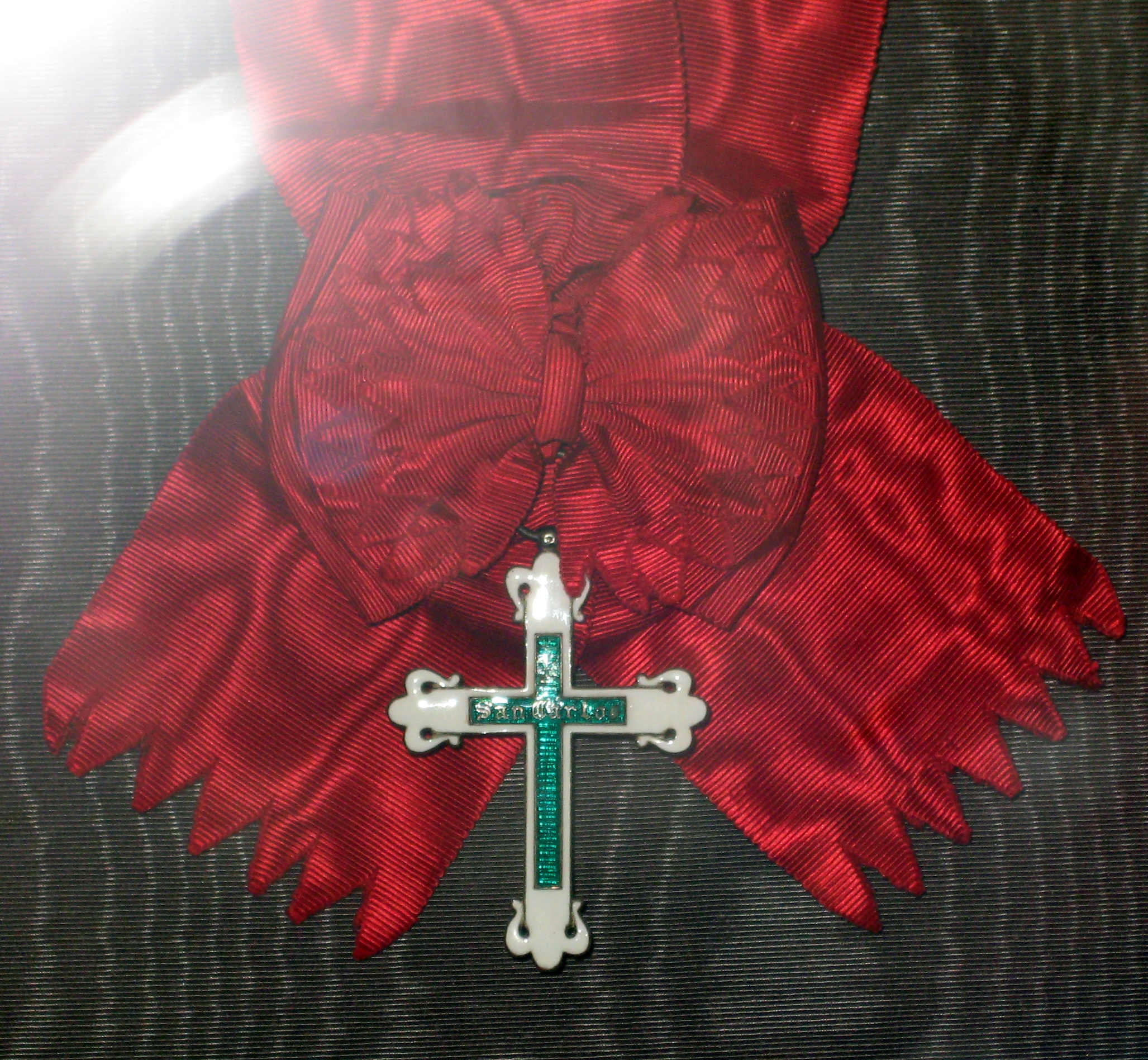
Cross of the Order of Saint Charles

- The Imperial Order of Saint Charles was created by Maximilian I on April 10, 1866. It was awarded exclusively to women who excelled in the service of their community. The Order honoured Saint Charles Borromeo, Patron Saint of Empress Carlota, sovereign of the Order. It was divided into two classes: the Grand Cross, awarded to only 24 Ladies; and the Cross, without any limit upon the number of women who might receive it.

=== Grand Crosses ===
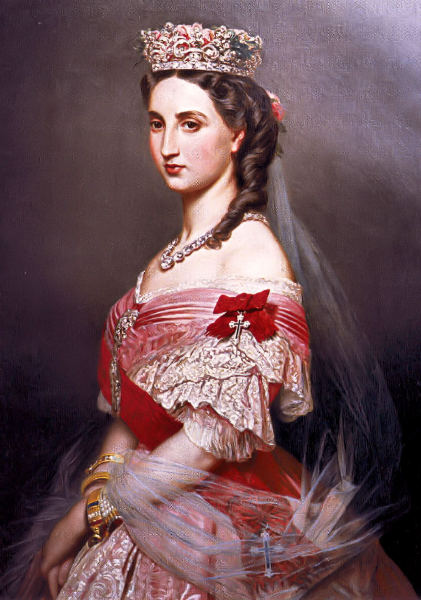
Empress Carlota of Mexico, wearing the sash and cross as sovereign of the Order of Saint Charles

Some Ladies Grand Cross of the Order of Saint Charles include:

- Queen Victoria of the United Kingdom
- Elizabeth of Bavaria, Empress of Austria and Queen of Hungary, consort of Franz Joseph I of Austria, Charlotte's sister-in-law
- Marie Henriette of Austria, Queen of Belgium, consort of Leopold II of Belgium, Charlotte's sister-in-law
- Maria Amalia of Naples and Sicily, former Queen of France, consort of Louis Philippe I, Charlotte's maternal grandmother
- Queen Isabella II of Spain
- Amélie of Leuchtenberg, Empress Dowager of Brazil, 2nd consort of Pedro I of Brazil
- Teresa Cristina of the Two Sicilies, Empress of Brazil, consort of Pedro II of Brazil
- Princess Leopoldina of Brazil
- Louise of Hesse-Kassel, Queen of Denmark, consort of Christian IX
- Eugenia María de Montijo de Guzmán, Empress of France, consort of Napoleon III
- María Manuela Kirkpatrick de Closebrun, Countess of Montijo y de Teba, Empress Eugénie's mother
- Princess Anne Murat, Duchess of Mouchy, daughter of Prince Lucien Murat

Insignia of the Order of Saint Charles, or Orden de San Carlos in Spanish

- Maria Pia of Savoy, Queen of Portugal, consort of Luís I of Portugal
- Augusta of Saxe-Weimar-Eisenach, Queen of Prussia, consort of future William I, German Emperor
- Victoria, Princess Royal, Future German Empress and Queen of Prussia, consort of future Frederick III, German Emperor
- Maria Feodorovna (Dagmar of Denmark), Empress of Russia, consort of Alexander III of Russia
- Amalie Auguste of Bavaria, Queen of Saxony, consort of John of Saxony
- Josephine of Leuchtenberg, Queen Mother of Sweden & Norway, consort of Oscar I of Sweden
- Louise of the Netherlands, Queen of Sweden & Norway, consort of Charles XV of Sweden

== See also ==
- First Mexican Empire
- Second Mexican Empire
- House of Iturbide
- Imperial Crown of Mexico
- Mexican nobility
- Mexican Honours System
- Order of the Aztec Eagle

== Sources ==
- Encuentra.com: The Popes and the Virgin of Guadalupe - in Spanish
- This article draws heavily on the corresponding article in the Spanish-language Wikipedia, which was accessed in the version of August 21, 2005.
