= Ludwig von Fautz =

Ludwig Ritter von Fautz
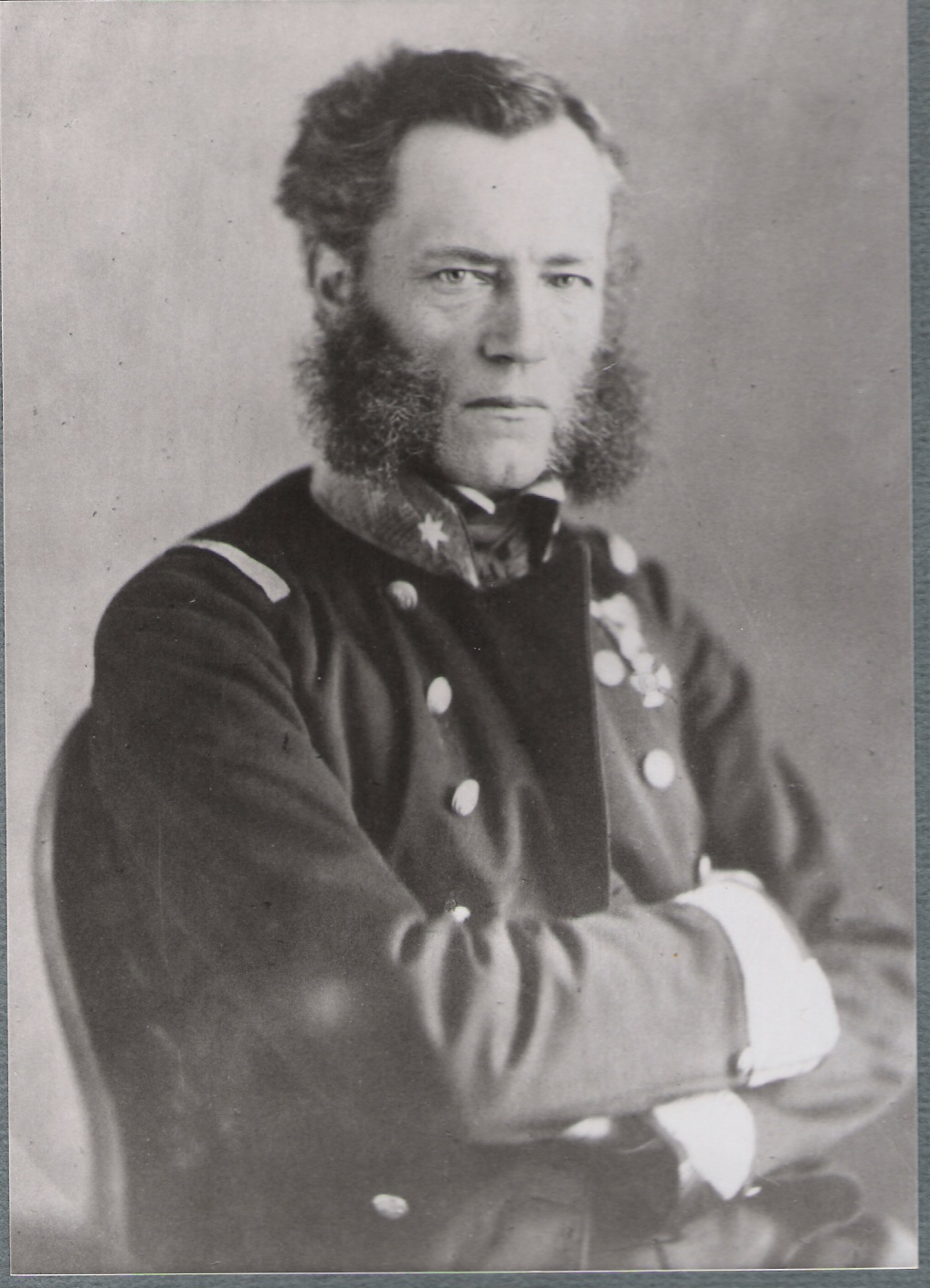
- Ludwig Ritter von Fautz as a rear admiral in 1860
- Born: Vienna
- Died: Vienna, Austria-Hungary (modern Austria)
- Military career
- Allegiance: Austrian Empire; Austria-Hungary
- Branch: Austro-Hungarian Navy
- Rank: Viceadmiral
- Conflicts: blockade of Venice; bombardement of Ancona; Besiege and bombardement of marroccain Ports; Action against Bocche di Cattaro

Ludwig Ritter von Fautz (20 August 1811 in Vienna – 23 February 1880 in Penzing, now Vienna) was vice admiral and commander of the Austrian Navy.

== Life ==
He was born as son of Anton Moritz Fautz (textile manufacturer and Draper Master) and Florentina Troclét in Vienna. His brothers were Lieutenant Colonel August von Fautz Knight of the Order of Leopold (died 28 July 1859 in Friedek Silesia), battalion commander in the Infantry Regiment No. 23 Baron Airoldi and Anton von Fautz, Major of the Arcièren Life Guard in Vienna of the Austrian Emperor. After joining the Navy on 8 March 1826 was Fautz in 1829 as a naval cadet in the bombing Moroccan Atlantic ports, in response to the hijacking of an Austrian ship by Moroccan pirates there. In First Italian War of Independence he was involved under Vice Admiral Hans Birch Dahlerup in the blockade of Venice and the bombardment of Ancona as commander of the steamer SMS volcano and SMS Curtatone. He suffered a severe injury (liver shot), the consequences of which he suffered until his death. He received for this application on 14 June 1849 for "proven bravery" the Knight's Cross of the Order of Leopold Award. Also at the action of the land forces standing under the command of General Lazarus of Mamula against the Bocche di Cattaro 1849 Fautz took part as the squadron commander.

In the sailing frigate SMS Venus he undertook numerous training cruises for the Naval College in the Mediterranean and travelled to England in 1849, to Naples, Lisbon and Madeira in 1850, and in 1851 to the West Indies, where he visited St. Thomas, La Guaira and also Havana, Cuba. Fautz was also honored with the Military Merit Cross of Austria-Hungary, Knight Commander of the papal Order of St. Gregory the Great, the Greek Order of the Redeemer, Privy Counselor and Grand Officer of the Order of Guadalupe.

In March 1852 Fautz was captain of a ship of the line and was one of the first Austrian captains who commanded a steam-powered and armoured battleship. With 27 December 1854 he was raised a Ritter (hereditary knighthood) of the Austrian Empire and 1856 he was appointed Rear Admiral. Since August 1856 he was under Archduke Ferdinand Maximilian chief of the newly created Marine Registry Board of the Emperor, 1852/1853, 1855 and 1859/1860 squadron commander and his Deputy from 1858 to 1860.

In the period 1860–1865 was Fautz commander of the entire Austrian navy since 1864 as Vice Admiral, from July 1865 – with the abolition of the Navy Department – until March 1868, he served as chief of the Naval Section (secretary of state) in k.u.k. Ministry of War. He was replaced by Wilhelm von Tegetthoff with whom he had numerous differences years earlier. In 1869 he entered the final retirement and plunged into the adventures of a late marriage (28 August 1869 with the fifteen years old Hermine Müllern von Schönenbeck), in which he was even fathered (the son was the Imperial Lieutenant Commander Gustav Heinrich Ritter von Fautz 1878–1922).

Military offices
Preceded by Archduke Ferdinand Maximilian	Commander-in-Chief of the Austro-Hungarian Naval Fleet; 1861–1865	Succeeded by Wilhelm von Tegetthoff
Preceded by Archduke Ferdinand Maximilian	Chief of the Naval Section; 1865–1868	Succeeded by Wilhelm von Tegetthoff
