= Cherokee War =

Cherokee War may refer to any of the following 18th- and 19th-century North American conflicts:

- Anglo-Cherokee War (1758-1761), or First Cherokee War
- Cherokee War of 1776, or Second Cherokee War
- Cherokee–American wars of 1776-1794
- Cherokee removal (1836-39), or "Trail of Tears"
- Texan Cherokee War (1838-39), part of the Texas–Indian wars
