= Wilhelm von Tegetthoff =

Austrian naval officer and politician (1827–1871)

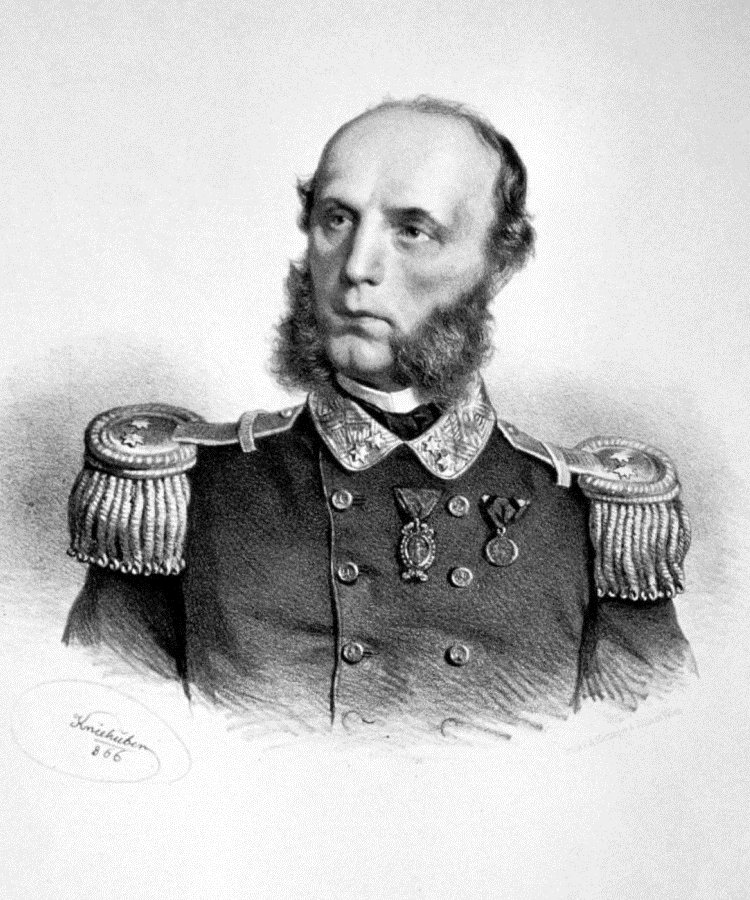
- Portrait by Joseph Kriehuber, 1866
- Born: 23 December 1827; Marburg an der Drau, Duchy of Styria
- Died: 7 April 1871 (aged 43); Vienna, Austria-Hungary
- Military career
- Allegiance: Austrian Empire; Austria-Hungary
- Branch: Austrian Navy; Austro-Hungarian Navy
- Service years: 1840–1871
- Rank: Vice admiral
- Conflicts: Second Schleswig War; Battle of Heligoland (1864); Third Italian War of Independence; Battle of Lissa (1866)

Vice-Admiral Wilhelm von Tegetthoff (23 December 1827 – 7 April 1871) was an Austrian naval officer and politician who served in the Second Schleswig War and Third Italian War of Independence. He is best known for his victory over an Italian fleet at the Battle of Lissa in 1866. The historian Antonio Schmidt-Brentano argued that von Tegetthoff was one of the most able naval officers of the 19th century due to his tactical inventiveness, sense of command and inspirational leadership.

== Early life and career ==
Tegetthoff was born in Marburg, Duchy of Styria in the Austrian Empire (now Maribor, Slovenia), on 23 December 1827. He was the son of Karl von Tegetthoff, an Oberstleutnant in the Austrian Army. On his mother's side he was related to Johann Kaspar Freiherr von Seiller, mayor of Vienna from 1851 to 1861. Entering the Austrian Naval Cadet School in Venice in 1840, Tegetthoff became a Seekadett on 23 July 1845 and witnessed the Venetian uprising in 1848/49. He received a commission upon his graduation on 16 April 1849 and took part in the blockade of Venice from May to August 1849. Tegetthoff was promoted to Fregattenleutnant on 16 June 1851 and Linienschiffsleutnant on 16 November 1852.

Tegetthoff received his first command, the naval schooner Elisabeth, in 1854. This was at the time of the Austrian Navy's intensive conversion to steam power, of which he was an earnest advocate. In 1855 he was appointed commander of the paddle steamer Taurus, patrolling the Sulina mouth of the Danube during the Crimean War. This service brought him to the favorable notice of Archduke Ferdinand Maximilian of Austria, the Oberkommandant der Marine (High Commander of the Navy), with whom he had been acquainted since 1850. Promoted to Korvettenkapitän in 1857, Tegetthoff served on a semi-official scientific expedition to the Red Sea and to the island of Socotra. Having shown exceptional diplomatic and organizational ability, in December 1857 he was appointed a staff officer. He was named commander in 1858 of the new screw corvette Erzherzog Friedrich on the coast of Morocco, then in a confused state of disorder.

The Italian campaign of 1859 saw the Austrians unable to challenge the French fleet for mastery of the Adriatic. With the return of peace, Tegetthoff accompanied Ferdinand Maximilian, who was to be the future Maximilian I of Mexico, on a voyage to Brazil to visit Emperor Pedro II during the winter of 1859/60. Promoted Fregattenkapitän on 27 April 1860 and Linienschiffskapitän on 23 November 1861, he was named commander of the Levant Squadron in 1862. In this capacity, he monitored the Greek revolution that deposed King Otto I and the anti-Western disturbances in Syria.

== Second Schleswig War ==
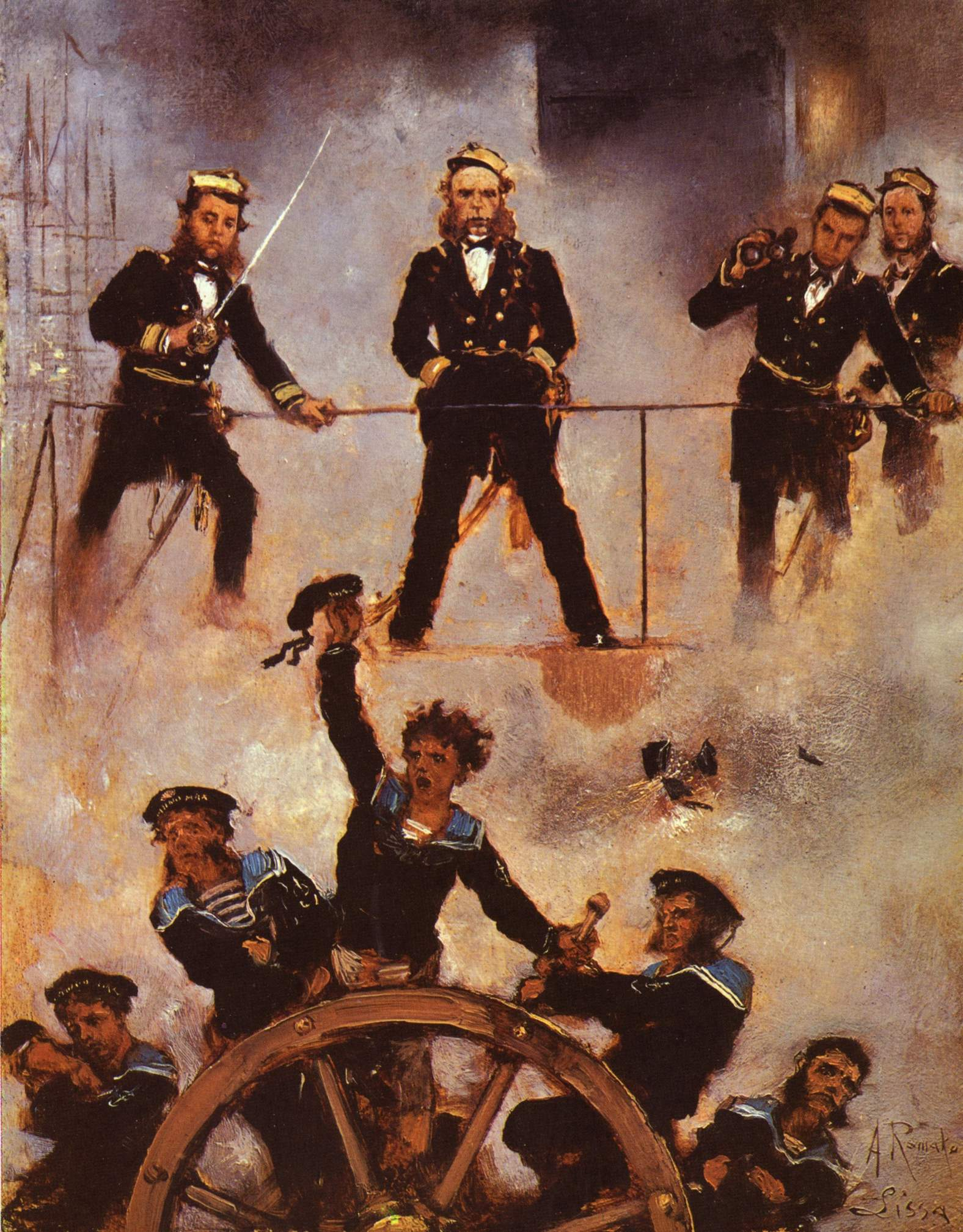
1880 painting by Anton Romako of Tegetthoff (centre) at the Battle of Lissa

During the Second Schleswig War, Tegetthoff as a Kommodore was given command, in February 1864, of a small Austrian squadron that sailed to the North Sea to support the weaker Prussian naval forces against the superior Danish navy which was blockading northern German ports. He was engaged by a Danish squadron commanded by Edouard Suenson at the Battle of Heligoland, in which Tegetthoff's flagship, the screw frigate SMS Schwarzenberg, caught fire in a close-range gunnery fight with the Danish frigates Niels Juel and Jylland. Although the action was a tactical defeat for Tegetthoff, he achieved his main objective since the Danish squadron was shortly thereafter recalled to Copenhagen, lifting the blockade of the Elbe and Weser ports. Tegetthoff's telegraphic dispatch was answered by Emperor Franz Josef I with another on 12 May 1864 promoting him Kontreadmiral (Rear Admiral) and conferring upon him the Order of the Iron Crown.

== Seven Weeks' War ==
Tegetthoff was appointed commander of the Austrian battle fleet on 9 May 1866, shortly before the Seven Weeks' War against Italy. Although the Italian fleet was larger and more powerful, Tegetthoff decided to engage it after a successful reconnaissance of the Italian base of Ancona on 27 June 1866. With their army suffering defeats against the Austrians during the first week of the war from 20 to 27 June 1866, the Italians sought a victory over the Austrian navy by sending their fleet against the Austrian naval base at Lissa, off the coast of Dalmatia near Spàlato (Split) on 16 July 1866. Encountering the Italian fleet early on the morning of 20 July 1866, Tegetthoff sailed straight for the center of the Italian fleet, hoping to ram the ships to make up for his own fleet's lack of firepower (Rammstoßtaktik). The smoke from the Italian ships made visibility very poor, however, and the Austrians missed the Italian fleet completely. Swinging around, Tegetthoff again charged, this time setting two Italian armored ships on fire and damaging several more.

After Tegetthoff's flagship, the Erzherzog Ferdinand Max, rammed and sank the armored Italian frigate Re d'Italia, the Italian fleet retreated the next day. Tegetthoff returned in triumph to his base at Pula. Nevertheless, his victory did not materially affect the outcome of the war, as Italy's alliance with Prussia ensured an advantageous peace due to Prussian victory in the Austro-Prussian War. Tegetthoff was immediately promoted, by telegraph, to Vizeadmiral (Vice Admiral). He received congratulatory telegrams from Ferdinand Maximilian, by then the embattled Emperor of Mexico, and Vizeadmiral Hans Birch Dahlerup, former Oberkommandant der Marine (High Commandant of the Navy). Tegetthoff was decorated with the Commander's Cross of the Military Order of Maria Theresa and made honorary citizen of Vienna.

Following the victory of Lissa, Tegetthoff urged Franz Josef to annex the hinterland of the Dalmatian coast, so as to protect the region for development of naval bases. This was in fact accomplished with the occupation (1878) and annexation (1908) of Bosnia and Herzegovina, though long after Tegetthoff's death.

Tegetthoff undertook a journey of study to France, Britain and the United States in 1866/67. Upon the execution of Ferdinand Maximilian by the Mexican government of Benito Juárez, Tegetthoff was sent with the screw frigate Novara to bring his body home to Austria, arriving in the port of Trieste on 16 January 1868.

== Late years ==
He received the post of Marinekommandant, as the chief administrative officer was named in 1865 in succession of Viceadmiral Ludwig von Fautz. In March 1868 Tegetthoff took also charge as Chef der Marinesektion (Chief of the Naval Section) of the War Ministry of the new dual monarchy. Despite considerable resistance from the General Staff, he vigorously pursued a complete reform of the Austro-Hungarian Navy; his reforms remained in force until the fall of the Donaumonarchie in 1918.

On 1 April 1868 Tegetthoff was made a Geheimrat and a member of the Herrenhaus. Tegetthoff died suddenly from pneumonia on 7 April 1871 in Vienna at the age of 43. His grave is located in the cemetery of St. Leonhard in Graz.

He was succeeded as head of the naval administration by Friedrich von Pöck.

== Memorials ==
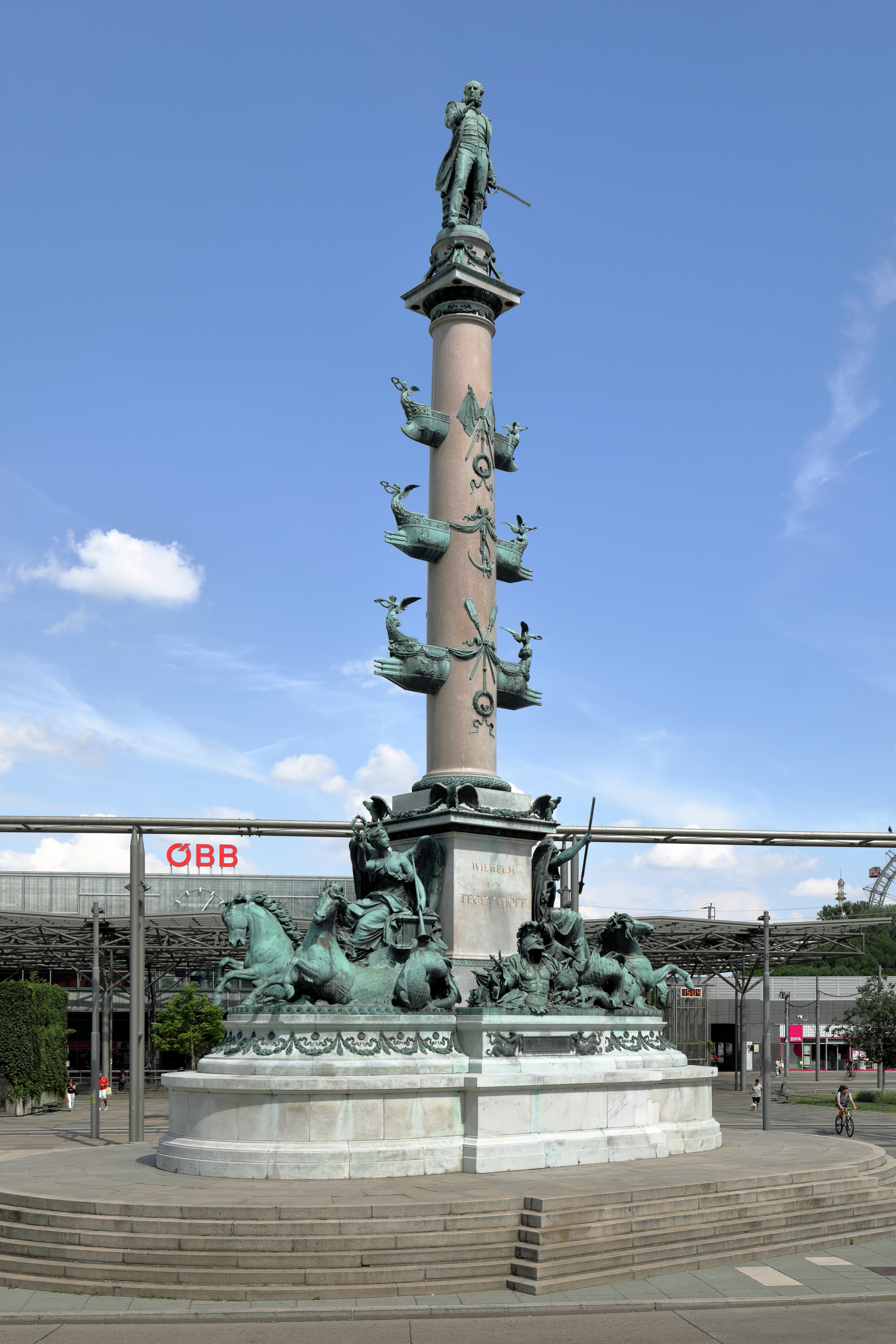
Memorial to Tegetthoff in Vienna

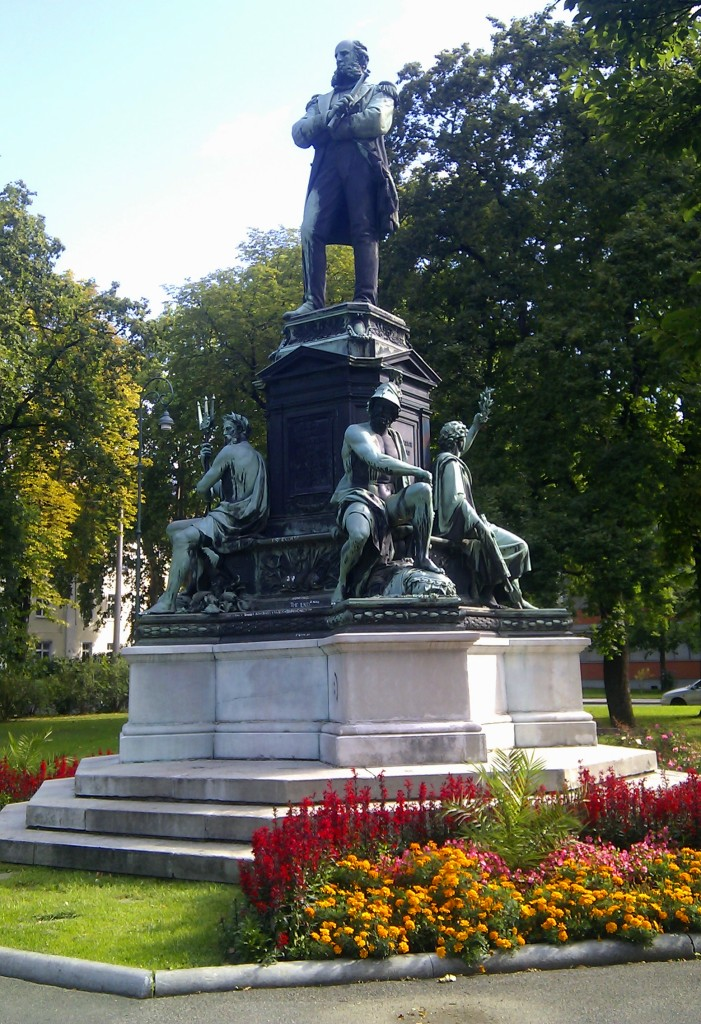
Memorial to Tegetthoff in Graz

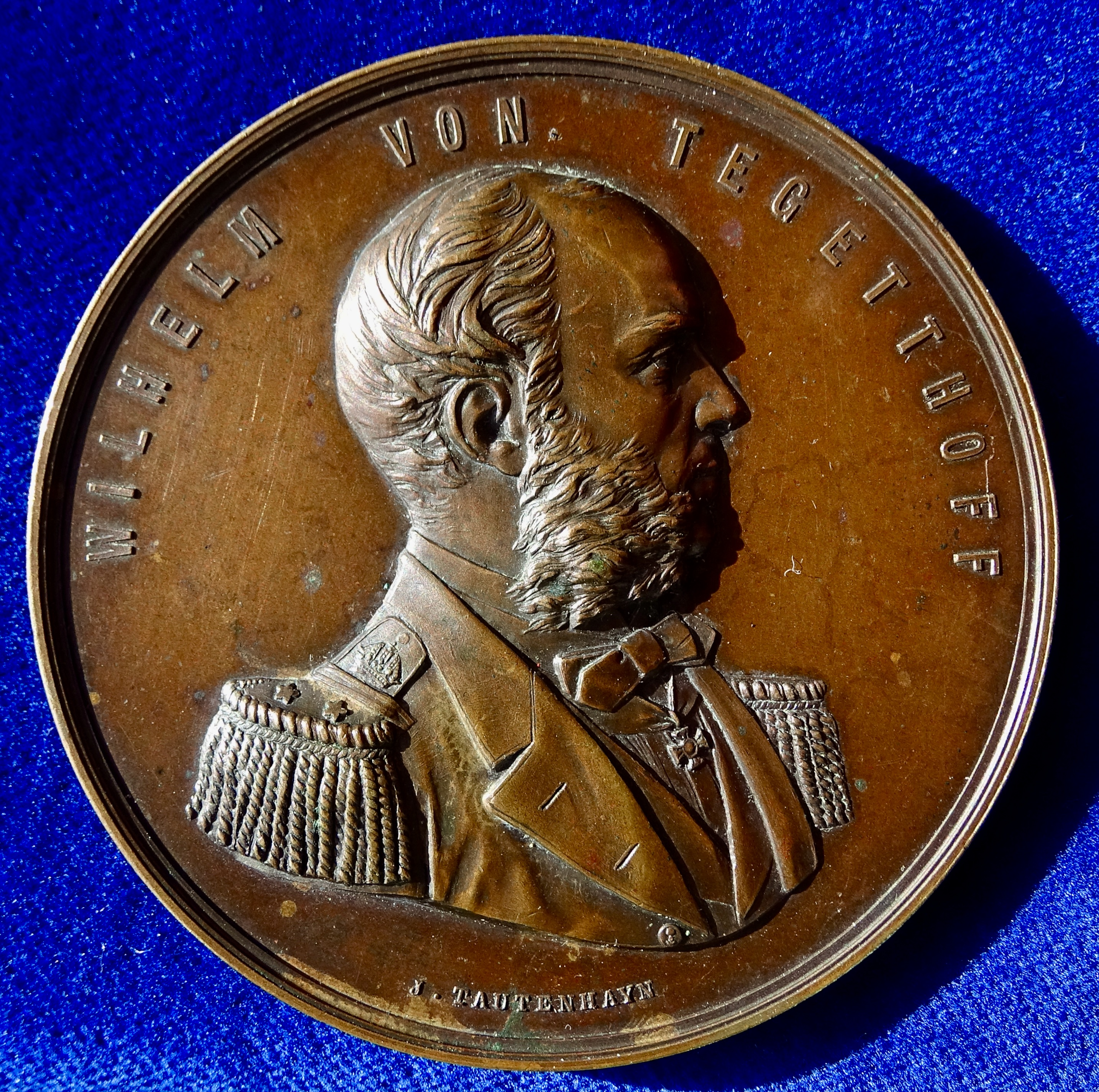
The uniformed portrait of the Admiral Tegetthoff on the obverse of the 1877 medal by Tautenhayn, commemorating his monument at Pula

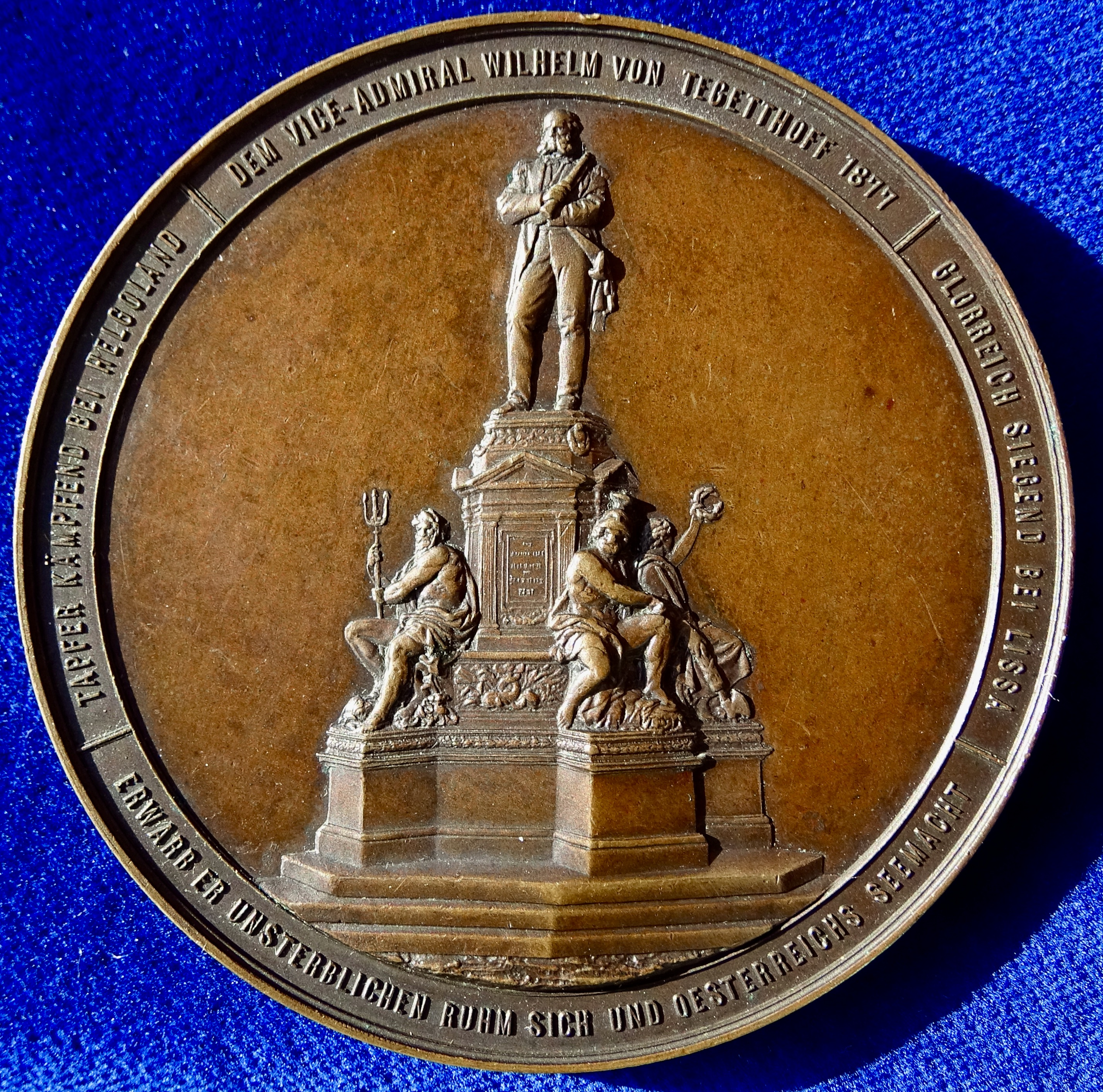
Pula, Istria, the reverse of that medal showing his monument erected by Carl Kundmann

Memorials to Tegetthoff were erected in Maribor, Vienna and Pula. The monument on Vienna's Praterstern, the largest traffic junction of the city, consists of a column 11 meters high (by Karl Hasenauer), topped by a bronze statue of Tegetthoff, some 3.5 meters in height, by Carl Kundmann and was finished in 1886. The memorial at Pula, also by Kundmann, was erected in 1877 and consists of a bronze statue of Tegetthoff, with supporting bronze mythological figures. Pula passed to Italian sovereignty in 1919, and in 1935 the monument was moved to Graz, Austria.

Tegetthoff was pictured on an Austrian postage stamp in 1935 and on a 20-euro coin minted in 2004 (see below). Ships named for Tegetthoff included:

- The arctic research ship SMS Tegetthoff (1872).
- The central battery ship SMS Tegetthoff (1878) – renamed SMS Mars in 1912.
- The dreadnought battleship SMS Tegetthoff (1912).

Of these, the first was used in the 1872–74 arctic expedition of Julius von Payer and Karl Weyprecht which discovered Franz Josef Land in 1873. The expedition's first discovery was named Cape Tegetthoff.

== See also ==
S.M.S. Erzherzog Ferdinand Max coin featuring Rear-Admiral Wilhelm von Tegetthoff.

- Wilhelm von Tegetthoff was the subject for a commemorative coin: the 20 euro S.M.S. Erzherzog Ferdinand Max minted on 15 September 2004. The reverse shows the Rear-Admiral after a painting by Anton Romako, standing on the bridge of the S.M.S. Erzherzog Ferdinand Max. In front of him four sailors are struggling with the wheel while bringing the ship into position.
- Austro-Hungarian Navy – the Navy following the 1867 Ausgleich, which created the Dual Monarchy
- SMS Tegetthoff (1912) – Austro-Hungarian dreadnought battleship
- Battle of Lissa for at more detailed description of his most famous sea battle.
- The Serbian word for ultramarine is "teget," based on shade of his uniform.

== Literature ==
- German Wikipedia entry 'Wilhelm von Tegetthoff' de:Wilhelm von Tegetthoff
- Joan Haslip, The Crown of Mexico. New York: Holt, Rinehart and Winston, 1971.
- Alan Palmer, Twilight of the Habsburgs. The Life and Times of the Emperor Francis Joseph. New York: Grove Press, 1994. ISBN 0-87113-665-1
- George Richard Marek, The Eagles Die. Franz Joseph, Elisabeth, and their Austria. New York: Harper & Row, 1974.
- Anthony Sokol, The Imperial and Royal Austro-Hungarian Navy. Annapolis: U.S. Naval Institute, 1968.
- Klaus Müller: Tegetthoffs Marsch in die Nordsee. Oeversee, Düppeler Schanzen, Helgoland im deutsch-dänischen Krieg, Verlag Styria, Graz 1991, ISBN 3-222-12007-2
- Christian Ortner: Der Seekrieg in der Adria 1866, in Viribus Unitis, Jahresbericht 2010 des Heeresgeschichtlichen Museums. Wien 2011, pp. 100–124, ISBN 978-3-902551-19-1.
- Ulrich Schöndorfer: Wilhelm von Tegetthoff, Berglandverlag, Wien 1958.
- Peter Handel-Mazzetti, Hans Hugo Sokol: Wilhelm von Tegetthoff. Ein großer Österreicher, OÖ Landesverlag, Linz 1952.
- Kapitel 7: Wilhelm von Tegetthoff, in Wilhelm Wolfslast: Helden der See. Band 1. Entdecker und Admirale, Berlin 1944, pp. 102–117.
- Helmut Neuhold: Österreichs Helden zur See. Styria Verlag Wien-Graz-Klagenfurt 2010, pp. 108–139. ISBN 978-3-222-13306-0.
- Agnes Husslein (ed.): Anton Romako. Tegetthoff in der Seeschlacht bei Lissa. Katalog zur Ausstellung in der Österreichischen Galerie Belvedere, Wien 2010, ISBN 978-3-901508-79-0.
- Pemsel, Helmut. "Wilhelm von Tegetthoff: Admiral of the Unexpected." In The Great Admirals: Command at Sea, 1587–1945. Edited by Jack Sweetman. Annapolis: Naval Institute Press, 1997. ISBN 0-87021-229-X.

Military offices
| Preceded by Ludwig von Fautz | Commander-in-Chief of the Austro-Hungarian Naval Fleet; 1865-1871 | Succeeded by Friedrich von Pöck |
| Preceded by Ludwig von Fautz | Chief of the Naval Section; 1868-1871 | Succeeded by Friedrich von Pöck |
