= Imperial Crown of Mexico =

Two crowns created for the Sovereign of Mexico

Heraldic depictions

Details
- Country: First Mexican Empire (1821–1823)
- Made: 1822
- Destroyed: c. 1823
- Cap: Red velvet

Imperial Crown of Mexico
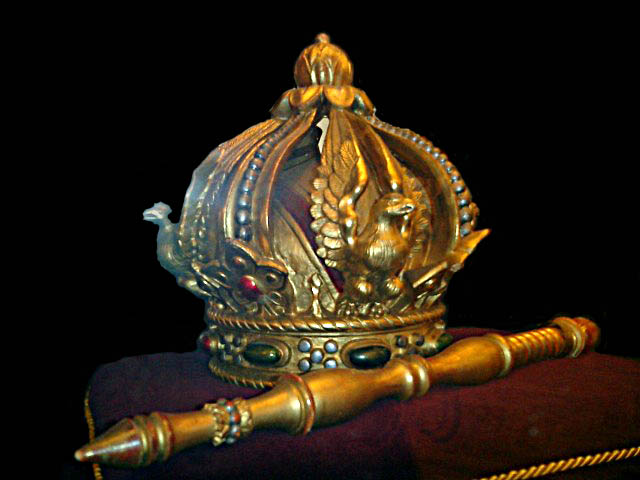
- Crown of Maximilian I (funerary)

Heraldic depictions

Details
- Country: Second Mexican Empire (1864–1867)
- Made: 1864
- Arches: two arches crossed over the top of the miter
- Cap: Red velvet
- Notable stones: Rubies, Emeralds
- Other elements: Gold Mexican eagles devouring snakes

The Imperial Crown of Mexico was the crown created for the Sovereign of Mexico on two separate occasions in the 19th century. The first was created upon the Declaration of Independence of the Mexican Empire from the kingdom of Spain in 1821, for the First Mexican Empire. The second crown was created upon the decree of the Assembly of Notables in 1863 for the Second Mexican Empire.

Flag of the First Mexican Empire (1821–1823) showing the Mexican crown.

Flag of the Second Mexican Empire (1865–1867) showing the Mexican crown.

== First Mexican Empire ==
The crown of the First Mexican Empire was made for Emperor Agustín I in 1822, and it can be seen in many of his portraits. However, its history is not entirely known.

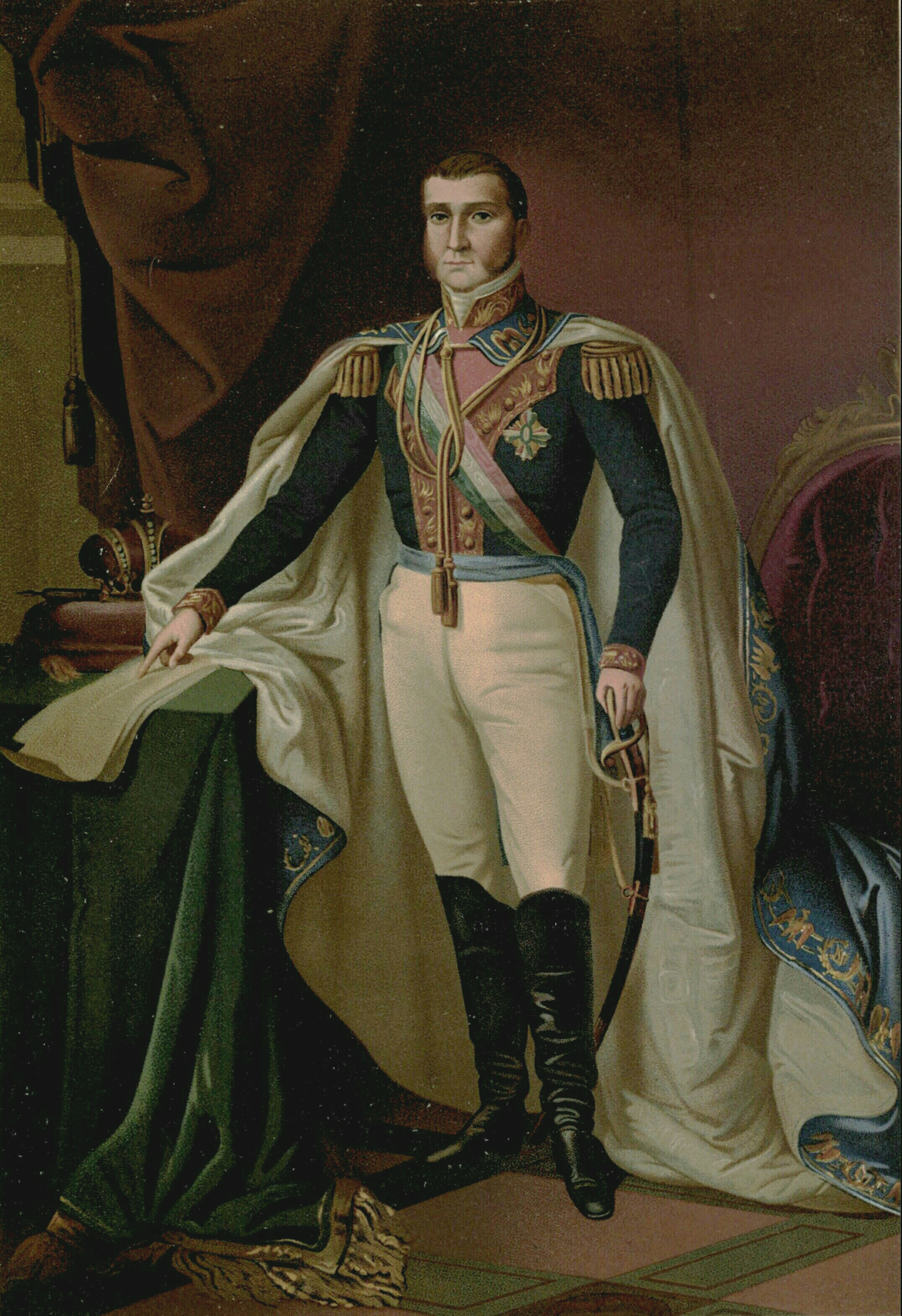
Emperor Agustín I with the crown of the First Mexican Empire.

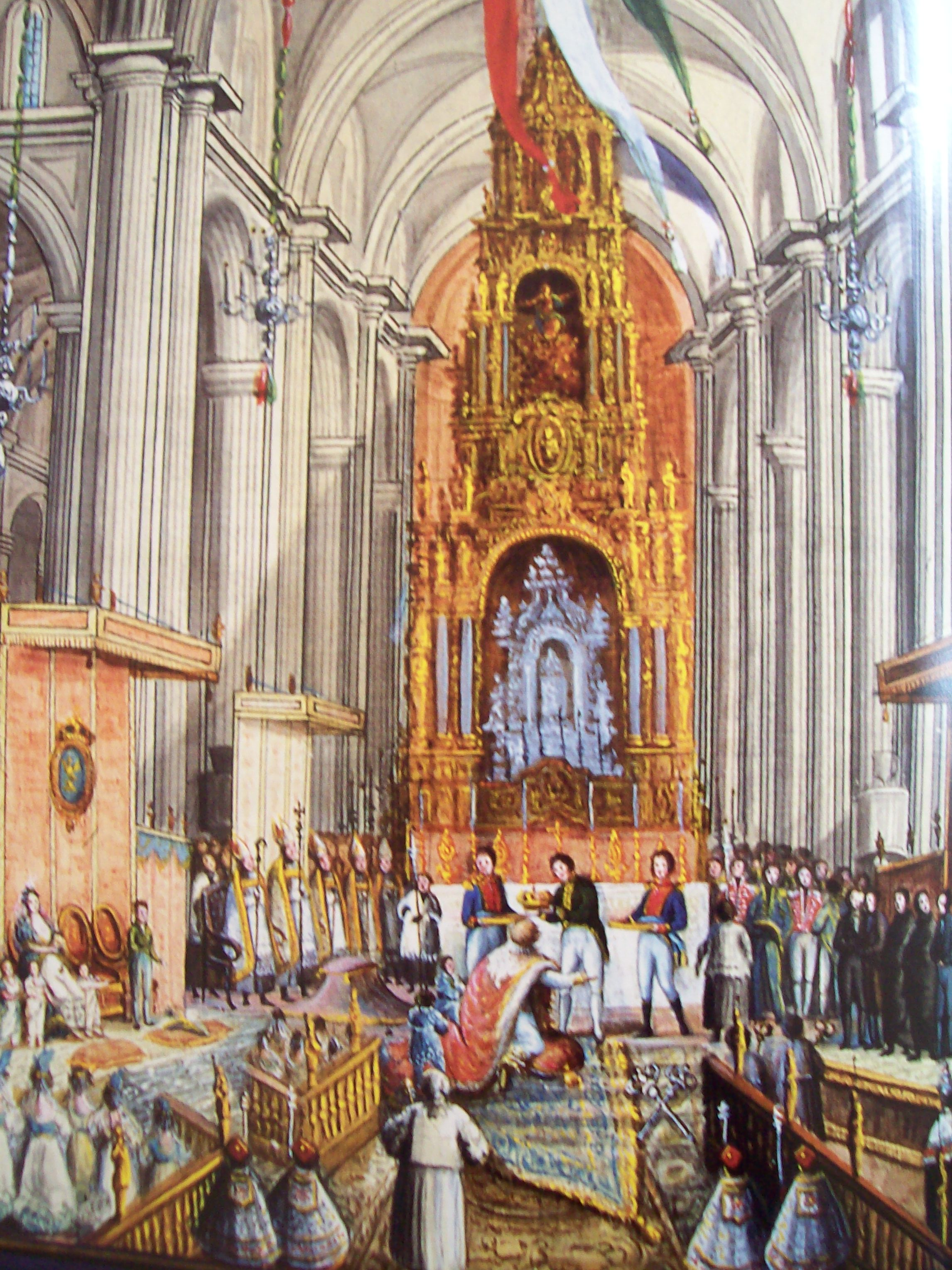
Coronation of Emperor Agustín I in July 1822.

Emperor Agustín I's crowned coat of arms.

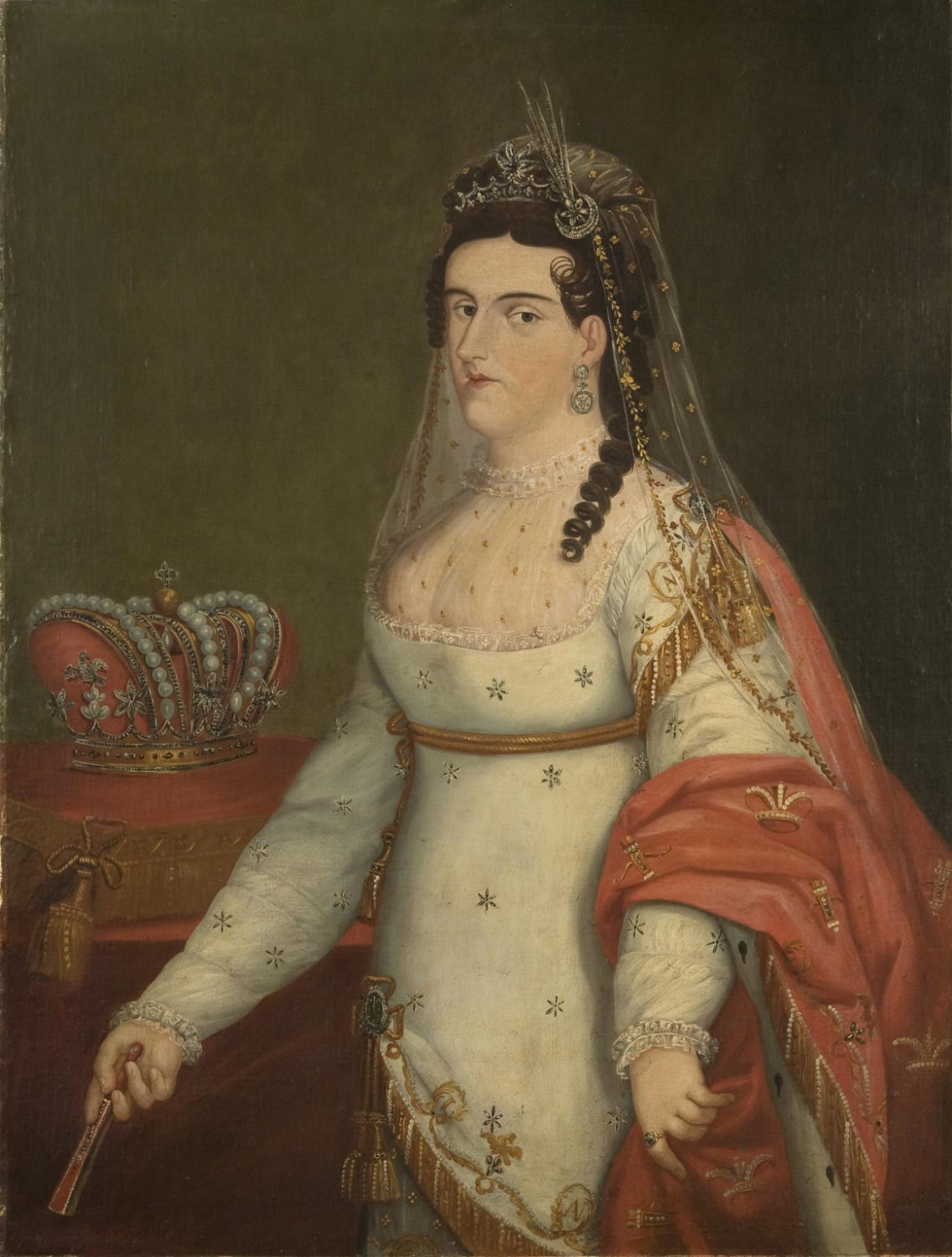
Empress consort Ana María with the Imperial Crown of Mexico.

== Second Mexican Empire ==
The second Imperial Crown of Mexico, created during the Second Mexican Empire for Emperor Maximilian I (his consort was Charlotte of Belgium, known as Empress Carlota), who reigned from 1864 to 1867, is better documented. The original crown was destroyed during the ensuing fighting and victory of the Mexican republic, but replicas remain on display.

The Imperial Crown of Mexico during Maximilian's reign was modeled on the crowns of France and Austria. The crown of Maximilian's ancestor, Maximilian I, Holy Roman Emperor, had two arches which crossed over the top of the miter. It is this unique form which appears to have been the model.

However, since Napoleon III was the main power behind the Second Mexican Empire, and as an extension of the Second French Empire, the Mexican crown also used the half-arches and eagles on the circlet on the front, back and sides from the crown of Napoleon III. The Imperial Crown of Mexico also shares many similarities with the Crown of Empress Eugenie, Napoleon III's consort.

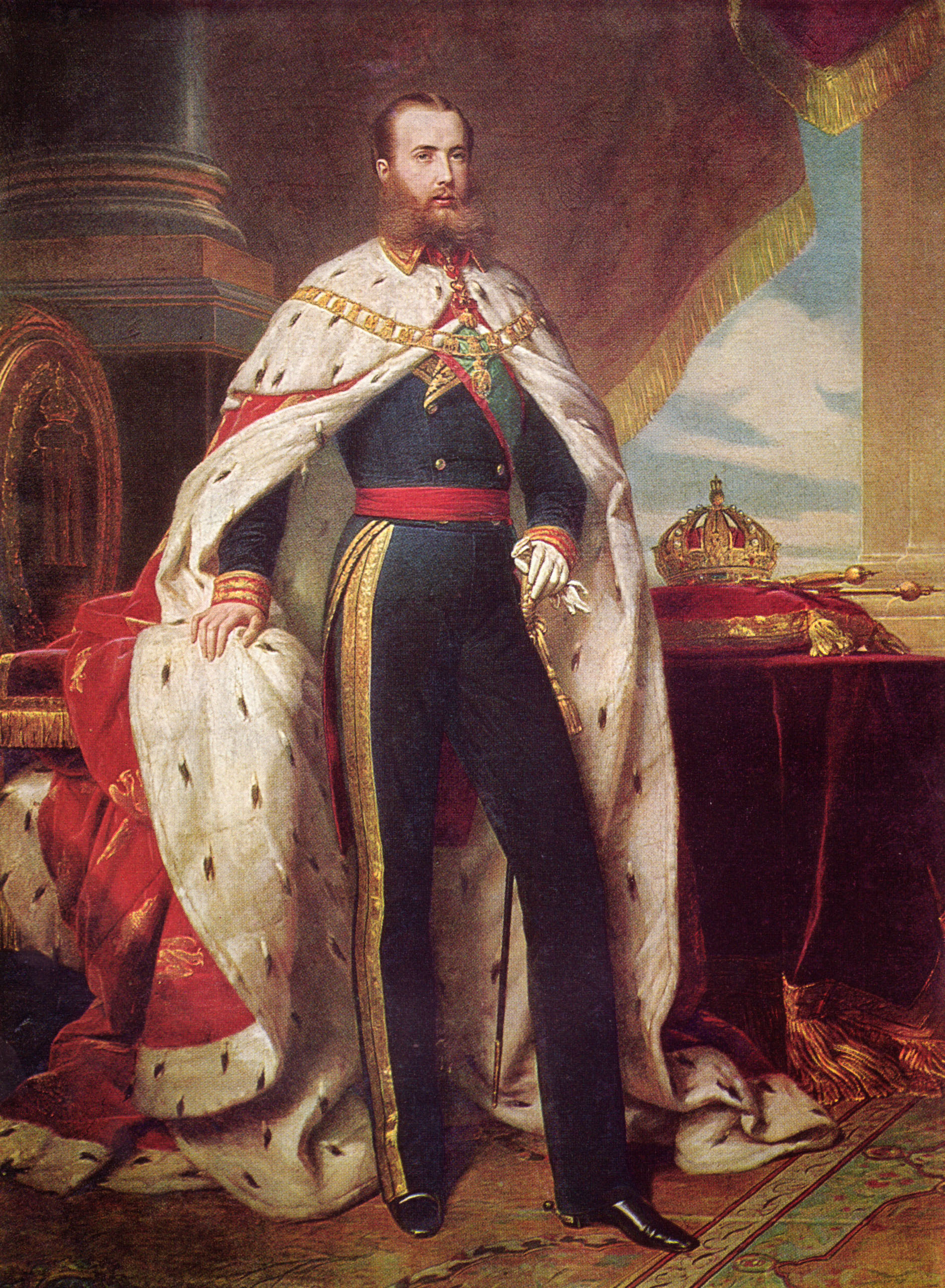
Emperor Maximilian I with the crown of the Second Mexican Empire.

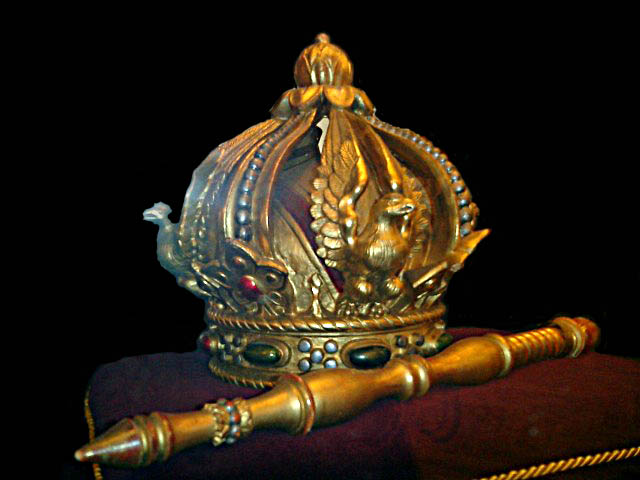
Funerary crown of Emperor Maximilian I, kept at the Imperial Furniture Depot in Vienna

The arms of the Second Mexican Empire showing the imperial crown above

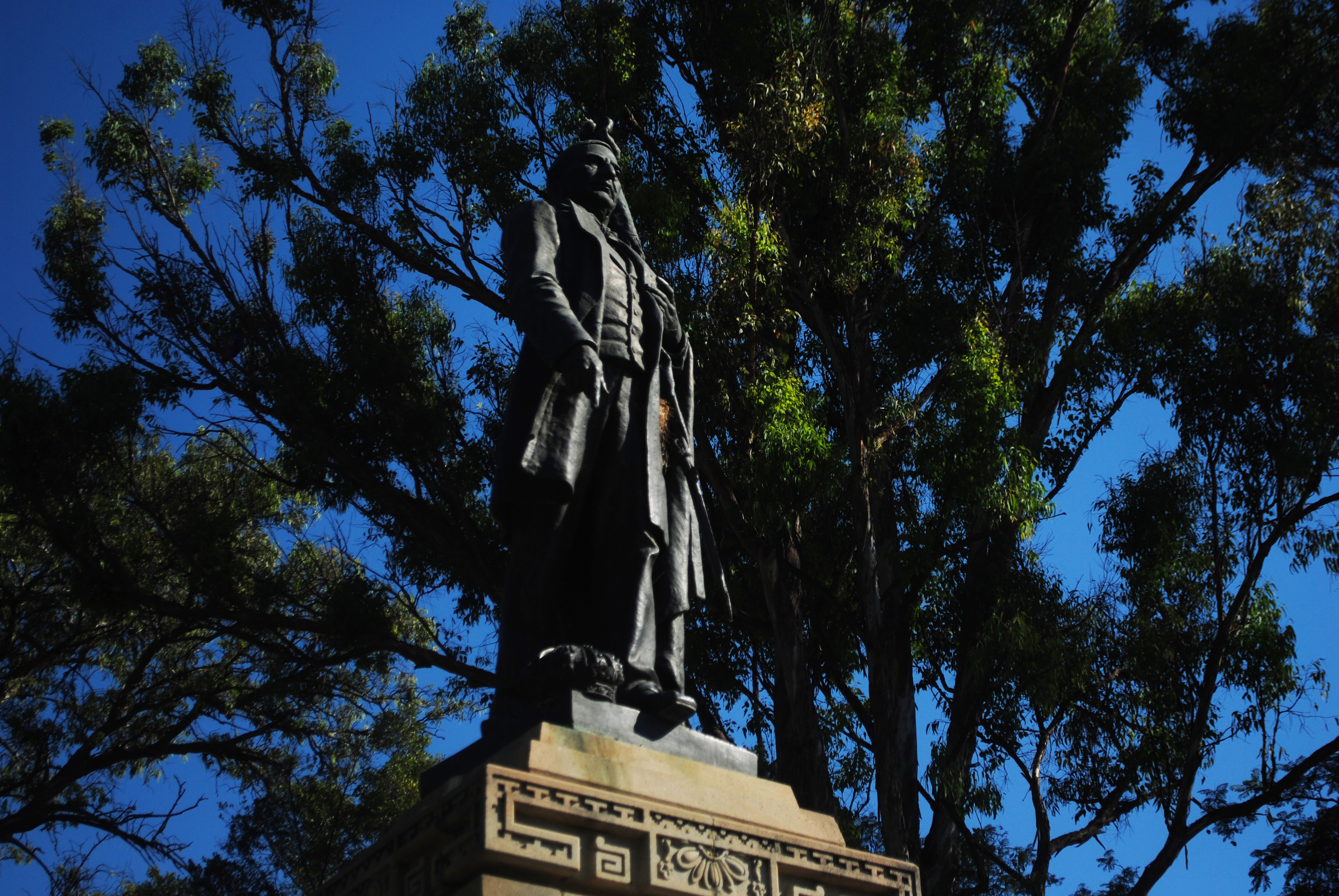
Statue of Benito Juárez made in 1894 at Paseo Juárez "El Llano" in the historic centre of Oaxaca. Juárez holds a Mexican flag with one hand and points with the other to the Imperial Crown of Mexico below, representing the republican defeat of the Second Mexican Empire.
