= Irreligion in Mexico =

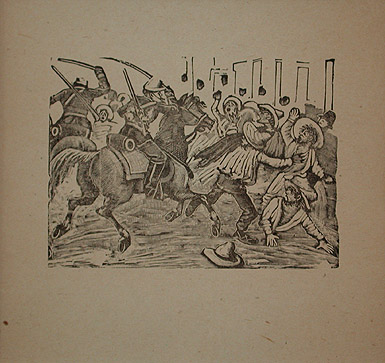
The Street Gazette: "Anti Clerical Manifestation", by Posada, shows the Mexican Army cavalry attacking irreligious peasants who protested the power of the Roman Catholic Church.

Irreligion in Mexico refers to atheism, deism, religious skepticism, secularism, and secular humanism in Mexican society, which was a confessional state after independence from Imperial Spain. The first political constitution of the Mexican United States, enacted in 1824, stipulated that Roman Catholicism was the national religion in perpetuity, and prohibited any other religion. Since 1857, however, by law, Mexico has had no official religion; as such, anti-clerical laws meant to promote a secular society, contained in the 1857 Constitution of Mexico and in the 1917 Constitution of Mexico, limited the participation in civil life of Roman Catholic organizations and allowed government intervention in religious participation in politics.

In 1992, the Mexican constitution was amended to eliminate the restrictions and granted legal status to religious organizations, limited property rights, voting rights to ministers, and allowed a greater number of priests in Mexico. Nonetheless, the principles of the separation of church and state remain; members of religious orders (priests, nuns, ministers, et al.) cannot hold elected office, the federal government cannot subsidize any religious organization, and religious orders, and their officers, cannot teach in the public school system.

Historically, the Roman Catholic Church dominated the religious, political, and cultural landscapes of the nation; yet, the Catholic News Agency said that there exists a great secular community of atheists, intellectuals and irreligious people, reaching 10% according to recent polls by religious agencies.

According to the 2020 census, 8% of the population is nonreligious. The Christian Post in 2026 reported that 14% of Mexico identified as atheist or as having no religion.

== Religion and politics ==
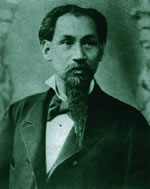
In his time, the writer and intellectual Ignacio Ramírez Calzada El Nigromante was hailed as the Voltaire of Mexico for criticizing the earthly, political power of the Roman Catholic Church

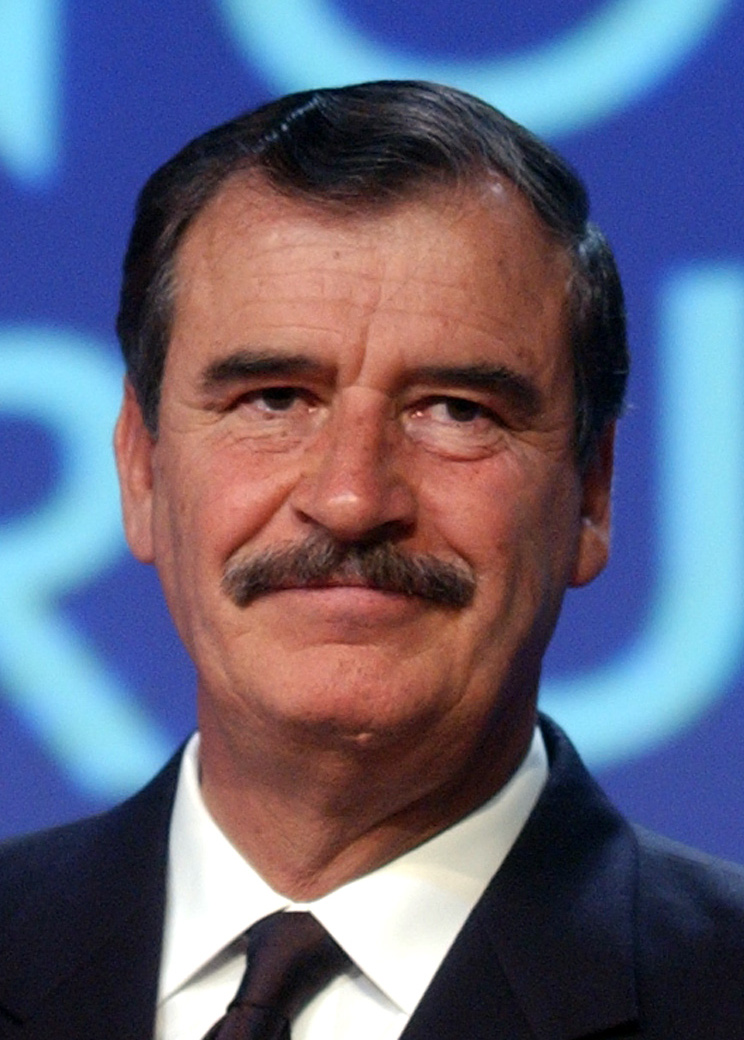
The assumption of the Mexican presidency (2000–06) by the Roman Catholic politician Vicente Fox raised speculation among liberal intellectuals that Mexican society might lose the secularism of public life.

Since the Spanish Conquest (1519–21), the Roman Catholic Church has held prominent social and political positions concerning the moral education of Mexicans – the ways that virtues and morals are to be socially implemented – and thus contributed to the Mexican cultural identity. Such cultural immanence was confirmed in the nation's first political constitution, which formally established Catholicism as the state religion while prohibiting all others. Article 3 of the 1824 Constitution of Mexico established that:

The Religion of the Mexican Nation, is, and will be perpetually, the Roman Catholic Apostolic. The Nation will protect it by wise and just laws, and prohibit the exercise of any other whatever". (Article 3 of the Federal Constitution of the Mexican United States, 1824)

For most of Mexico's 300 years as the Imperial Spanish colony of the Viceroyalty of New Spain (1519–1821), the Roman Catholic Church was an active political actor in colonial politics. In the early period of the Mexican nation, the vast wealth and great political influence of the Church spurred a powerful anti-clerical movement, which found political expression in the Liberal Party. By the middle of the 19th century, there were reforms limiting the political power of the Mexican Catholic Church. In response, the Church supported seditious Conservative rebels to overthrow the anti-clerical Liberal government of President Benito Juárez and welcomed the anti-Juárez French intervention in Mexico (1861), which established the military occupation of Mexico by the Second French Empire, under Emperor Napoleon III.

About the Mexican perspective of the actions of the Roman Catholic Church, the Mexican Labour Party activist Robert Haberman said:

By the year 1854, The Church gained possession of about two-thirds of all the lands of Mexico, almost every bank, and every large business. The rest of the country was mortgaged to the Church. Then came the revolution of 1854, led by Benito Juárez. It culminated in the Constitution of 1857, which secularised the schools and confiscated Church property. All the churches were nationalised, many of them were turned into schools, hospitals, and orphan asylums. Civil marriages were obligatory. Pope Pius IX immediately issued a mandate against the Constitution, and called upon all Catholics of Mexico to disobey it. Ever since then, the clergy has been fighting to regain its lost temporal power and wealth. (The Necessity of Atheism, p. 154)

At the turn of the 19th century, the collaboration of the Mexican Catholic Church with the Porfiriato, the 35-year dictatorship of General Porfirio Díaz, earned the Mexican clergy the ideological enmity of the revolutionary victors of the Mexican Revolution (1910–20); thus, the Mexican Constitution of 1917 legislated severe social, political, economic and cultural restrictions upon the Catholic Church in the Republic of Mexico. Historically, the 1917 Mexican Constitution was the first political constitution to explicitly legislate the social and civil rights of the people and served as constitutional model for the Weimar Constitution of 1919 and the Russian Constitution of 1918. Nevertheless, like the Spanish Constitution of 1931, it has been characterized as being hostile to religion.

The Constitution of 1917 prohibited the Catholic clergy from working as teachers and as instructors in public and private schools; established State control over the internal matters of the Mexican Catholic Church; nationalized all Church property; proscribed religious orders; forbade the presence in Mexico of foreign-born priests; granted each state of the Mexican republic the power to limit the number of, and to eliminate, priests in its territory; disenfranchised priests of the right to vote and to hold elected office; banned Catholic organizations that advocated public policy; forbade religious publications from editorial commentary about public policy; prohibited the clergy from wearing clerical garb in public; and voided the right to trial of any Mexican citizen who violated anti-clerical laws.

During the Mexican Revolution (1910–20), the national rancour provoked by the history of the Catholic Church's mistreatment of Mexicans was aggravated by the collaboration of the Mexican High Clergy with the pro–U.S. dictatorship (1913–14) of General Victoriano Huerta, "The Usurper" of the Mexican Presidency; thus, anti-clerical laws were integral to the Mexican Constitution of 1917, in order to establish a secular society. In the 1920s, the enforcement of the Constitutional anti-clerical laws by the Mexican Federal Government provoked the Cristero Rebellion (1926–29), the clerically abetted armed revolt of Catholic peasants known as "The Christers" (Los cristeros). The social and political tensions between the Catholic Church and the Mexican State lessened after 1940, but the constitutional restrictions remained the law of the land, although their enforcement became progressively lax. The government established diplomatic relations with the Holy See during the administration of President Carlos Salinas de Gortari (1988–94) and the Government lifted almost all restrictions on the Catholic Church in 1992. That year, the government ratified its informal policy of not enforcing most legal controls on religious groups by, among other things, granting religious groups legal status, conceding them limited property rights, and lifting restrictions on the number of priests in the country. However, the law continues to mandate strict restrictions on the church and bars the clergy from holding public office, advocating partisan political views, supporting political candidates, or opposing the laws or institutions of the state. The Church's ability to own and operate mass media is also limited. Indeed, after the creation of the Constitution, the Catholic Church has been acutely hostile towards the Mexican government. As Laura Randall in his book Changing Structure of Mexico points out, most of the conflicts between citizens and religious leaders lie in the Church's overwhelming lack of understanding of the role of the state's laicism. "The inability of the Mexican Catholic Episcopate to understand the modern world translates into a distorted conception of the secular world and the lay state. Evidently, perceiving the state as anti-religious (or rather, anti-clerical) is the result of 19th-century struggles that imbued the state with anti-religious and anti-clerical tinges in Latin American countries, much to the Catholic Church's chagrin. Defining laicist education as a 'secular religion' that is also 'imposed and intolerant' is the clearest evidence of episcopal intransigence."

== Demographics ==
From 1940 to 1960, about 70% of Mexican Catholics attended church weekly while in 1982, only 54% partook of Mass once a week or more, and 21% claimed monthly attendance. Recent surveys have shown that only around 3% of Catholics attend church daily; however, 47% percent of them attend church services weekly and, according to INEGI, the number of atheists grows annually by 5.2% while the number of Catholics grows by 1.7%.

== Irreligion by state ==
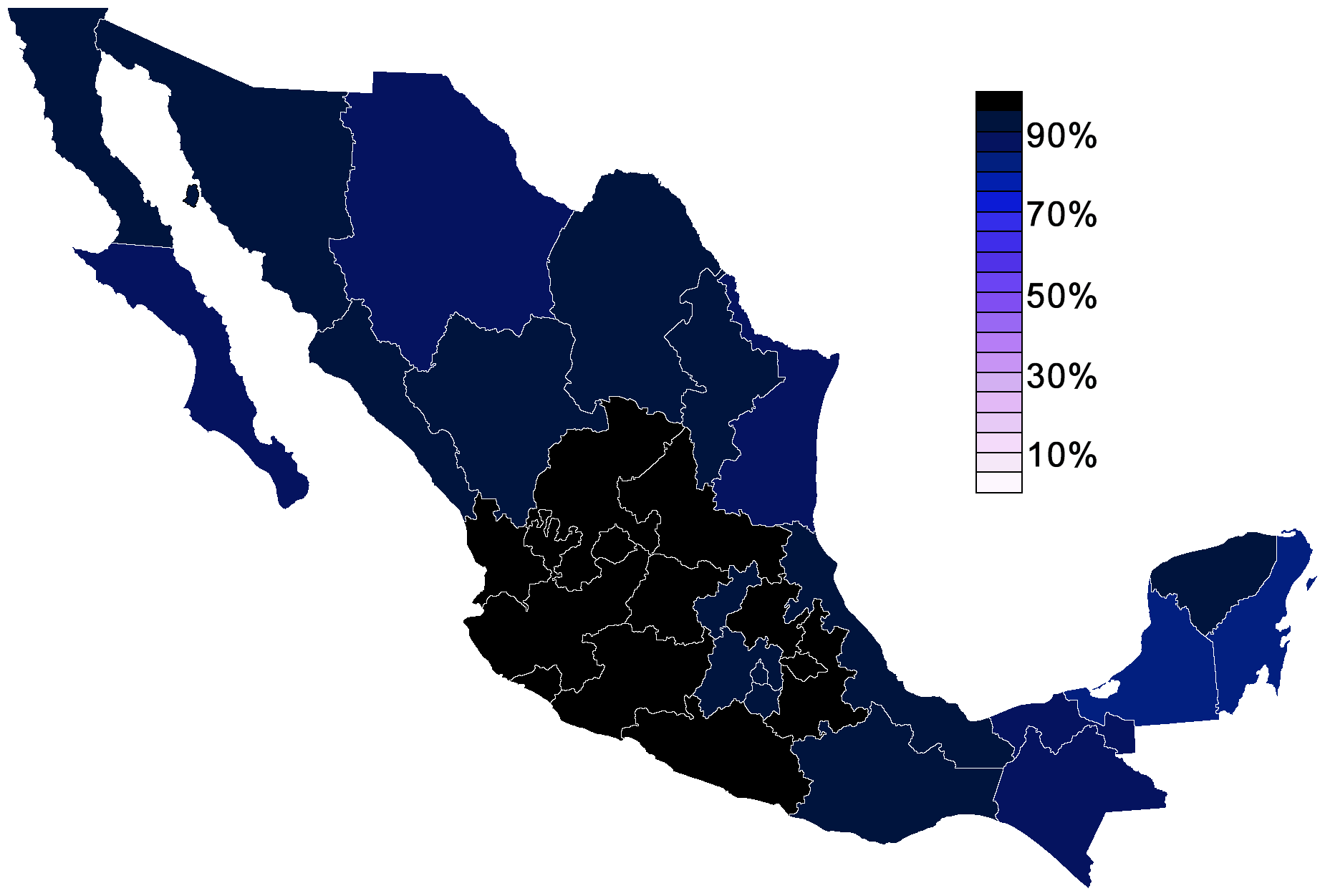
Percentage of state populations that identify with a religion rather than "no religion", 2010.

Rank	Federal Entity	% Irreligious	Irreligious Population(2010)
1	Quintana Roo	13%	177,331
2	Chiapas	12%	580,690
3	Campeche	12%	95,035
4	Baja California	10%	315,144
5	Tabasco	9%	212,222
6	Chihuahua	7%	253,972
7	Sinaloa	7%	194,619
8	Tamaulipas	7%	219,940
9	Sonora	7%	174,281
10	Veracruz	6%	495,641
11	Morelos	6%	108,563
12	Baja California Sur	6%	40,034
13	Coahuila	6%	151,311
14	Federal District	5%	484,083
-	Mexico	5%	5,262,546
15	Yucatán	5%	93,358
16	Oaxaca	4%	169,566
17	Nuevo León	4%	192,259
18	Durango	4%	58,089
19	Nayarit	3%	37,005
20	México	3%	486,795
21	Colima	3%	20,708
22	Guerrero	3%	100,246
23	Hidalgo	2%	62,953
24	San Luis Potosí	2%	58,469
25	Querétaro	2%	38,047
26	Aguascalientes	2%	21,235
27	Michoacán	2%	83,297
28	Puebla	2%	104,271
29	Jalisco	2%	124,345
30	Guanajuato	1%	76,052
31	Tlaxcala	1%	14,928
32	Zacatecas	1%	18,057

== Timeline of events related to atheism or anti-clericalism in Mexico ==
- 1821 – Mexico is born after its independence as a confessional state. The first Mexican constitution was enacted in 1824; it stated in Article 3 that the religion of the nation is and will perpetually be the Roman Catholic Apostolic, and prohibited the exercise of any other religion.
- 1831 – Vicente Rocafuerte was arrested in Mexico for publishing an Essay on Religious Toleration. He was accused of violating Article 3 of the constitution, which stated that Mexico was a confessional state.
- 1844 – Ignacio Ramírez "El Nigromante" wrote "There is no God: natural beings support themselves", causing several controversies throughout the country.
- 1855 – The Ley Juárez (Juárez's Law) of 1855, abolished special clerical and military privileges, and declared all citizens equal before the law.
- 1857 – Liberal Constitution of 1857 drafted during the presidency of Ignacio Comonfort granting basic civil liberties for all Mexicans: freedom of speech, freedom of conscience, secularised education and suppression of the Church power.
- 1906 – Flores Magón published his Manifesto to the Nation, The Plan of the Mexican Liberal Party declaring: "The clergy, this unrepentant traitor, this subject of Rome, this irreconcilable enemy of native liberties, in place of finding tyrants to serve and from whom to receive protection, will find instead inflexible laws which will put a limit on their excesses and which will confine them to the religious sphere."
- 1917 – The 1917 Constitution of Mexico is the first one in the world to set out social rights, serving as a model for the Weimar Constitution of 1919 and the Russian Constitution of 1918. Articles 3, 5, 24, 27, and 130, as originally formulated, seriously restricted religious freedoms. These anticlerical resolutions were included in the Mexican Constitution as a consequence of the support given by the High Mexican Catholic Clergy to the dictatorship of Victoriano Huerta.
- 1924 – Election of atheist Plutarco Elías Calles. Calles applied anti-clerical laws throughout the country and added his own anti-clerical legislation.
- 1926 – In June 1926, Elías Calles signed the "Law for Reforming the Penal Code", known unofficially as the Calles Law. This provided specific penalties for priests and individuals who violated the provisions of the 1917 Constitution.
- 1926 – On November 18, 1926, the Pope issues the encyclical Iniquis afflictisque (On the Persecution of the Church in Mexico). The Pope criticized the state's interference in matters of worship, outlawing of religious orders and the expropriation of Church property. Alluding to the deprivation of the right to vote and of free speech, among other things, he noted that, "Priests are ... deprived of all civil and political rights. They are thus placed in the same class with criminals and the insane."
- 1927 – Cristero uprising.
- 1927 – November 23, 1927, Miguel Pro, SJ is killed after being convicted, without trial, on trumped-up charges of conspiring to kill President Obregon. Calles' government carefully documented execution by photograph hoping to use images to scare Cristero rebels into surrender, but the photos had the opposite effect.
- 1927 – September 29, 1932 Pope Pius XI issued a second encyclical on the persecution, Acerba animi.
- 1928 – July 17, 1928 the Mexican elected president Álvaro Obregón is assassinated by José de León Toral, a Roman Catholic militant who was afraid that Obregón would continue with Calles anti-clerical agenda.
- 1934 – There were 4,500 priests serving the people before the rebellion, in 1934 there were only 334 priests licensed by the government to serve fifteen million people, the rest having been eliminated by emigration, expulsion and assassination.
- 1934 – Between 1926 and 1934 at least 40 priests were killed.
- 1935 – By 1935, 17 states had no priest at all.
- 1937 – The Pope issues the third encyclical on the persecution of the Mexican Church, Firmissimam Constantiamque.
- 1940 – Between 1931 and 1940 at least 223 rural teachers were assassinated by the Cristeros and other Catholic armed groups, because of their atheist and socialist education.
- 1940 – By 1940 the Church had "legally had no corporate existence, no real estate, no schools, no monasteries or convents, no foreign priests, no right to defend itself publicly or in the courts, and no hope that its legal and actual situations would improve. Its clergy were forbidden to wear clerical garb, to vote, to celebrate public religious ceremonies, and to engage in politics", but the restrictions were not always enforced.
- 1940 – Manuel Ávila Camacho, a professed religious believer, becomes President. This was a change from his predecessors in the first half of the 20th century who had been strongly anticlerical. His open profession of faith was politically dangerous as it risked the ire of Mexican anticlericals.
- 1940 – By 1940 open hostility toward the Church began to cease with the election of President Ávila (1940–46), who agreed, in exchange for the Church's efforts to maintain peace, to nonenforcement of most of the anticlerical provisions, an exception being Article 130, Section 9, which deprived the Church of the right of political speech, priests of the right to vote, and the right of free political association.
- 1948 – In June 1948, Diego Rivera painted the mural Dreams of a Sunday in the Alameda at the Del Prado Hotel depicting Ignacio Ramírez holding a sign reading, "God does not exist". Rivera would not remove the inscription, so the mural was not shown for 9 years – after Rivera agreed to remove the words. He stated: "To affirm 'God does not exist', I do not have to hide behind Don Ignacio Ramírez; I am an atheist and I consider religions to be a form of collective neurosis. I am not an enemy of the Catholics, as I am not an enemy of the tuberculars, the myopic or the paralytics; you cannot be an enemy of the sick, only their good friend in order to help them cure themselves." The Publicity in the newspapers had been riot-provoking, and Rivera's stand – "I will not remove one letter from it" – brought forth a mob of some thirty persons who vandalised everything in their path. They further violated the mural by defacing the self-portrait of Rivera as a young boy. On that very night, not far from the hotel, Rivera, along with Mexico's leading artists and intellectuals, was attending a dinner honouring the director of the Museum of Fine Art. When the word arrived about the attack on Rivera's mural, it caused a stir in the audience. David Alfaro Siqueiros exhorted the guests to go to the Del Prado Hotel and, arm-in-arm with José Clemente Orozco and Dr. Atl, marched at the head of 100 people. Among them were Frida Kahlo, Juan O'Gorman, Raul Anguiano y José Revueltas. When they arrived Rivera climbed on a chair, asked for a pencil and calmly began to restore the destroyed inscription: "God does not exist".
- 1979 – Pope John Paul II visits Mexico and violates Mexican anticlerical laws by appearing in public wearing clerical garb and by engaging in public religious observances; some anticlericals objected to the violation of the law and President José López Portillo himself offered to pay the 50 pesos fine.
- 1992 – Publication of Rius' illustrated book 500 years screwed but Christian, a book critical of the Spanish conquerors, the Catholic Church and its effects on Mexican society.
- 2008 – On 28 September 2008, the First Global Atheist March for a Secular Society was held in Mexico City and Guadalajara as a part of a series of global protests that call for the civil rights of atheists and non-religious people.
- 2009 – On Saturday 26 June 2009, during a meeting celebrating the International Day against Drug Abuse and Illicit Trafficking, president Felipe Calderón stated that atheism and irreligion render the youth criminals and leave them at the mercy of drug traffickers. His statement was prompted by a previous opinion on the death of Michael Jackson. Before the results of the singer's autopsy, Calderón claimed that Jackson's death was due to his purported abuse of drugs and his lack of faith. According to him, the lack of religion and union with God fosters addictions and crime among young people. A letter from a community of Mexican atheists was submitted to La Jornada newspaper as a counter-attack to the allegations against non-religious people, claiming that the president's position was a crystal-clear example of discrimination against minorities in the country.
- 2009 – Mexico City played host to international symposium on religious freedom in Latin America sponsored by the Knights of Columbus, the first time such an event has occurred in Mexico City. Sociologist Jorge Trasloheros noted that many powerful Mexicans see religion not as "the opium of the masses", but as "the tobacco of the masses"—a bad habit to be banned from the public arena. Supreme Knight Carl Anderson denounced this idea still commonly held in Mexico that "religious beliefs are not welcome in the public square, or worse are not allowed in the public square".
- 2010 – In March 2010, the lower house of the Mexican legislature introduced legislation to amend the Constitution to make the Mexican government formally "laico"—meaning "lay" or "secular". Critics of the move say the "context surrounding the amendment suggests that it might be a step backwards for religious liberty and true separation of church and state". Coming on the heels of the Church's vocal objection to legalization of abortion as well as same sex unions and adoptions in Mexico City, "together with some statements of its supporters, suggests that it might be an attempt to suppress the Catholic Church's ability to engage in public policy debates". Critics of the amendment reject the idea that "Utilitarians, Nihilists, Capitalists, and Socialists can all bring their philosophy to bear on public life, but Catholics (or other religious minorities) must check their religion at the door" in a sort of "second-class citizenship" which they consider nothing more than religious discrimination.

== Mexican atheists ==
- Guillermo Arriaga, screenwriter and novelist
- Hector Avalos, religion researcher
- Narciso Bassols, co-founded the Popular Party
- Luis Buñuel, Spanish-Mexican filmmaker
- Plutarco Elías Calles, president (1924–1928)
- Ricardo Flores Magón, anarchist revolutionary activist from the early 20th century
- Carlos Frenk, cosmologist
- Tomás Garrido Canabal, politician
- Guillermo Kahlo
- Manuel de Landa, philosopher and artist
- Germán List Arzubide, poet and revolutionary
- Carlos A. Madrazo, politician
- Subcomandante Marcos, activist
- Juan O'Gorman, artist
- Ignacio Ramírez, "El Nigromante" also known as the Voltaire of Mexico
- Rius, cartoonist and highly critical of the Catholic Church
- Diego Rivera, muralist and Marxist
- Guillermo del Toro, filmmaker, author and actor
- Remedios Varo, Spanish-Mexican surrealist artist
- Alvaro Obregon, President
- Fernando Vallejo, Colombian-Mexican writer
- Jorge Volpi, author

== See also ==
- Demographics of atheism
- Religion in Mexico
