= Ignacio Ramírez (politician) =

19th-century Mexican writer and politician

Ignacio Ramírez "El Nigromante"
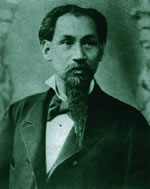
- Born: Ignacio Ramírez Calzada; 22 June 1818; San Miguel de Allende, Mexico
- Died: 15 June 1879 (aged 60); Mexico City, Mexico
- Occupations: Writer, lawyer, poet

Juan Ignacio Paulino Ramírez Calzada (22 June 1818 – 15 June 1879), more commonly known as Ignacio Ramírez, was a 19th century Mexican liberal intellectual and statesman. He was known for publishing various newspapers championing progressive causes, and he would often use the pen name El Nigromante, (the Necromancer). He served in more than one presidential cabinet and would go on to become president of the supreme court.

Ramírez belongs to the generation of Mexican liberals of La Reforma; which includes other intellectuals such as Ponciano Arriaga, Miguel Lerdo de Tejada, Melchor Ocampo, and Guillermo Prieto.

While the Liberal Party consistently supported anti-clerical measures, Ramírez was also one of its few partisans who openly expressed atheism.

== Early life ==
Ramírez was born at San Miguel el Grande in Guanajuato on 22 June 1818. His father, Lino Ramírez, had already been a noted liberal, who was named as vice governor of Querétaro during the presidency of the progressive Valentin Gomez Farias. Lino educated the young Ignacio from an early age and passed on to him his liberal ideals.

He began his studies at Santiago de Querétaro, before transferring to the Colegio of San Gregorio in Mexico City. Ramírez's thesis at the Academy of San Juan de Letrán in Mexico City consisted of defending the proposition that "there is no God; natural beings sustain themselves". The faculty including José María Lacunza congratulated him on his discourse, but it still caused a public scandal.

In 1845, he began to publish a newspaper called Don Simplico. The paper was shut down in 1846 under the conservative government of Mariano Paredes, and Ramírez found himself arrested along with fellow contributors Guillermo Prieto and Manuel Payno.

== Early political career ==
It was at this point that the Mexican–American War broke out. After a series of military failures, the Mariano Paredes administration would fall later in the year and meanwhile the liberal Francisco Modesto de Olaguíbel Martinón had become governor of the State of Mexico. Modesto appointed Ramírez to the state government, and he served on the governor's council.

The federal government then named Ramírez as the administrator of the territory of Tlaxcala, where he attempted to organize the war effort, but he was forced to resign and leave Tlaxcala in the wake of the controversy that resulted after he cancelled the annual religious celebration of the Virgin of Ocotlán. Meanwhile the war with the United States had ended.

Ramírez moved to Toluca, where he worked as a professor and he founded the radical liberal newspaper Temis y Deucalión. The paper caused Ramírez to once again get in trouble with the law, but he was ultimately acquitted of any wrongdoing.

In 1852, Francisco de la Vega y Rábago, the governor of Sinaloa, appointed Ramírez to the state government, but Ramírez stepped down and fled to Baja California after a conservative government under Santa Anna came to power at Mexico City in 1853. Nonetheless Ramírez stayed in the country and once again found a job teaching, resulting in his imprisonment. Ramírez remained in prison for eleven months until Santa Anna was overthrown by the Plan of Ayutla in 1853. Ramírez met one of the leaders of the Ayutla Plan, and future president of Mexico, Ignacio Comonfort, who made Ramírez his secretary, but they parted ways over differences in politics, Comonfort being much more of a moderate than Ramírez.

== La Reforma ==
Ramírez then joined a more radical faction of liberals including his old colleague Guillermo Prieto, Melchor Ocampo, and future president Benito Juárez. He participated in the pivotal Constitutional Congress of 1856 to 1857, as a representatives for the state of Sinaloa. The congress would go on to draft a new constitution for the nation which would ultimately trigger almost ten years of civil war. He also founded another progressive newspaper, El Clamor Progresista which endorsed the minister Miguel Lerdo de Tejada for the presidency.

The promulgation of the Constitution of 1857 in September of that year produced enormous controversy, and ultimately the moderate Comonfort joined a self coup instigated by the conservative general Felix Zuloaga triggering the Reform War. Comonfort would ultimately back out of the plan and the constitutional presidency passed to Benito Juarez who managed to set up his capital in Vera Cruz. Throughout the war Ramírez found himself imprisoned multiple times, but he was freed after the moderate conservative Manuel Robles Pezuela overthrow Zuloaga and declared a prisoner amnestry. Ramírez found himself in Vera Cruz, and he collaborated with the Juarez government in passing the Reform Laws. By the end of 1860, the liberals had won the war.

The triumphant Juarez government moved back to Mexico City and Ramírez was named to the cabinet, along with Guillermo Prieto. Ramírez would serve as head of the joint Ministry of Justice, Public Instruction, and Development through which he pursued various liberal reforms.

== Second French Intervention ==
He stepped down from his post in mid 1861. At the time, President Juarez had cancelled the payment of foreign debts in response to a financial crisis and Mexico was threatened with foreign intervention by France, Spain, and the United Kingdom. With Guillermo Prieto, Ignacio Altamirano, and Jose Iglesias, Ramírez then founded another newspaper called La Chinaca which was intended to lift the national spirit in the face of the impending foreign invasion.

A French invasion finally began in April, 1862, but was temporariliy repulsed after the Battle of Puebla in May. The Mexican congress met in April 1863 during which Ramírez advocated the nationalization of the monasteries at Puebla to fund the war effort, advice which was accepted and carried out. Meanwhile French reinforcements had arrived, and Mexico City was taken in June, 1863. Ramírez left the capital and headed towards Sinaloa where he continued to publish progressive periodicals attacking the Second French intervention in Mexico and the establishment of the Second Mexican Empire.

He returned to Mexico City but was discovered and imprisoned by the Imperial government after which he was transferred to Yucatan. Ramírez was freed when the Empire fell in 1867.

== Later life ==
After the fall of the Empire, Ramírez figured amongst the liberal opposition to Benito Juárez who had held on to the presidency for ten years.

Ramírez was elected president of the Supreme Court and was also named Minister of Justice by President Porfirio Díaz. He died on 15 June 1879.

== Works ==
=== Essays ===
Some of his renown studies and essays are:

- "Dos lecciones inéditas sobre literatura" ("Two Unpublished Lessons on Literature", read at Instituto Políglota de Toluca)
- Libros rudimental y progresivo para la enseñanza primaria (1873)
- Lecciones de literatura (Lessons on Literature, 1884)
- Estudios sobre literatura (Studies on Literature)

=== Articles ===
He published famous periodistic articles in the following 19th century Mexican liberal newspapers:

- Don Simplicio
- Temis y Deucalión
- El Siglo Diez y Nueve
- El Clamor Progresista
- La Insurrección
- El Monitor Republicano
- La Chinaca
- La Estrella de Occidente
- La Opinión
- El Correo de México
- El Mensajero

== See also ==
- Guillermo Prieto
- Irreligion in Mexico
- Liberalism in Mexico
