= Haberman =

Haberman is a surname of Germanic origin. People with the name include:

- Clyde Haberman, American journalist
- Daniel Haberman (1933–1991), American poet
- Hardy Haberman, American author, filmmaker, educator, designer
- Maggie Haberman (born 1973), American journalist
- Mandy Haberman, English inventor and entrepreneur, inventor of the Haberman feeder
- Martin Haberman (1932–2012), American educator, university dean, and author; eponym of The Haberman Educational Foundation
- Rex Haberman (1924–1999), American politician from Nebraska
- Robert Haberman (1883–1962), Romanian-American socialist lawyer and left-wing activist; Mexican government minister
- Sabina Haberman, birth name of Sabina Wolanski (1927–2011), Polish Holocaust survivor and author
- Seth Haberman (born 1960), American developer of viewer-customized television advertising
- Steven Haberman (born 1951), English professor of actuarial science

== See also ==
- Haberman station a former Long Island Rail Road station
