= Irreligion in Latin America =

Irreligion in Latin America refers to various types of irreligion, including atheism, agnosticism, deism, secular humanism, secularism and non-religious. According to a Pew Research Center survey from 2014, 8% of the population is not affiliated with a religion. According to Latinobarómetro, the share of irreligious people in Latin America quadrupled between 1996 and 2020, from 4% to 16%.

== Central America and Caribbean ==
=== Costa Rica ===
According to World Religion Database, 3.42% of Costa Ricans are either atheist or agnostic. Approximately, 27% of the Costa Rican population is irreligious, either non-practitioner, atheist or agnostic.

=== Cuba ===
Estimates of the Cuban people without religion varies from 30% to 40%, the number of atheists also from 10% to 20%.

=== Dominican Republic ===
Religiously unaffiliated people account 18% in Dominican Republic.

=== El Salvador ===
According to World Religion Database, 2.57% is non-religious (atheist or agnostic).

=== Guatemala ===
According to World Religion Database, 1.37% is non-religious (atheist or agnostic). According to Spirit and Power Survey, 15% is non-believer or atheistic. According to World Values Survey, 3.6% do not believe in God. According to the national Survey Prodatos, in 2016, 11% of population reported being non-religious. In 2002, according to nationwide surveys, 11.7% reported themselves as non-religious, while the metropolitan area they were 9.5%, in other regions the percent were substantially higher, being 15.4% in the northern-west and 17.7% in Peten. By 1998–1999, the Department of Health survey found that 16% of population was irreligious. In 2010 decade, Pew Center Research considered that only 5% or less into Guatemalan population is irreligious, this change of criteria could be influenced by the increasing of poverty from 51% to 59% between 2006 and 2014, along the resistant conservative branch in the politic environment.

=== Haiti ===
In Haiti, only 1% is not religious.

=== Honduras ===
According to World Religion Database, 2.04% is non-religious (atheist or agnostic).

=== Mexico ===
According to 2020 census by the National Institute of Statistics and Geography (INEGI), 8 percent of population is non-religious (5% of atheists convinced), increasing from 5 percent in 2010. A survey question in 2006 by CID-Gallup about religious importance revealed that almost 30% of Mexican consider religion as not important. According to World Population Review, 38% of the Mexican population is irreligious.

=== Nicaragua ===
Nicaragua experienced a growth of non-religious between census 1995 and 2005, were more than 15% were classified as none, and 3% classified as convinced atheist. According to free sources, nearly 20% of Nicaraguans are unaffiliated.

=== Panama ===
About 5% of Panamanians are irreligious (3% non-religious and 2% atheists).

=== Puerto Rico ===
Irreligion in Puerto Rico is relatively recent and has grown in recent years; about 11.1% of Puerto Ricans have no religion (6% non-religious and 5.1% atheists).

== South America ==
=== Argentina ===
A survey conducted in August 2019 (CEIL/CONICET) reports that 18.9% of Argentines are non-religious, growing from 11% since 2008 report. It is observed that 81.9% believe in God and 18.1% do not. Ledges of Gender, age, education level and geographical location have all been cited as variables for irreligion, among men between 18 and 29, people with higher education and industrialized areas tend presence less belief in God roughly 83% and 89%. A CID-Gallup poll affirms that 16% of the Argentine population claims to be irreligious (8% non-religious and 8% atheists). While a recent 2020 survey from Latinobarometro report an unexpected growth as high as 40% of population.

Ipsos research in 2023, found that 63% of Argentinians were Christian, 25% had no religion, 5% were in other religions, and 7% did not answer.

=== Bolivia ===
In Bolivia, a large majority of the population is religious, of which only 3% of the population is atheist, agnostic or non-religious. A study in the Sucre City estimated that 7% does not have religion (the least religious area of the country).

=== Brazil ===
Although in Brazil a large majority of the population is religious, a revealed 2000 Census by the Brazilian Institute of Geography and Statistics (IBGE) estimate 7.3% of the population being atheist, agnostic or non-religious. In 2010, the IBGE revealed an increased 8.3%, this tiny increment was because evangelical, religiously new age and afro-religions increasings.

=== Chile ===
In Chile, the proportion of people who are religious dropped from 92% in 1995 to 71% in 2015 according to Latinobarometro. Almost 17% of Chileans are atheist and 12% non-religious. In September 2011, a group of atheists founded the Atheist Society of Chile (In Spanish: Sociedad Atea de Chile). According to Latinbarometer poll in 2017 Chile is the second most irreligious country in South America after Uruguay with 38% of the population not following any religion.

=== Colombia ===
According to national census studies, between 1997 and 2004 non-religious people increased from 2.2% to 7% but convinced atheists remain less than 1%. In 2009, Americas Barometer reported little changes and placed 6.1% of non-religious and atheists convinced almost 1%. There are atheist organizations in Metropolitan cities.

=== Ecuador ===
According to the National Statistics Institute of Ecuador in 2011, 8.05% of Ecuadorians are not religious (7.94% atheists and 0.11% agnostics). There are atheists and secular organizations in the capital city or Quito.

=== Paraguay ===
According to the 2012 Pew Global Religious Landscape study, 1.1% of Paraguayans are religiously unaffiliated.

=== Peru ===
According to the 2017 Peruvian Census data, 5.1% of the Peruvian population older than 12 years old describes themselves as irreligious, but some sources estimate around 8% of population.

The irreligious population is predominantly urban (85.5%) and masculine (61.4%), about breakdown ages, 40.4% of total irreligious are people within the ages 18 and 29, while only 11.8% is older than 50 years.

According to WIN International Survey, supported by Datum Internacional, 92% of Peruvians expressed their belief in God, 72% considered themselves religious, 20% non-religious and only 3% declared themselves to be atheist.

=== Uruguay ===
Uruguay is the most secularized nation in the Americas, with the highest percent of atheists and agnostics. 17.2% atheist or agnostic according to Uruguayan census. While according to the most recent official survey approximately 58.1% of Uruguayans define themselves as Christian, Many Uruguayans nominally describe themselves as Roman Catholics, but lifestyle is not affected by the religion.

According to Kaufmann, E. (2010), 47% of Uruguayans are not religious, more than half are atheists or 25% and the other part is characterized of agnostics and non-religious, according to national census 2007, 40% of Uruguayans were not religious, of which 23% claim believed in God but does not follow any religion and 17% are atheists or agnostics.

Irreligion in Uruguay has a long history. During the 19th century, secularist political parties fought against the Catholic hegemony, although internally the society has been shallowly religious. Since 1919, the State is completely laicist or not confessional, and since 1920, Uruguayans have referred to Easter Week as "Tourism Week".

=== Venezuela ===
In Venezuela, secularization has been influencing the country specially in religious practicing since the industrialization during the 20th century, but since early twenty-first century, Protestants are also growing in the country. According to the University of Cambridge estimation, 11.7% of Venezuelans are without religion (atheists 6% and 5.7% of non-religious), also a national study estimated that 6% of Venezuelans are agnostics and 2% atheists, a total of 8% unaffiliated, being very popular into professional class according to the national investigation.

== See also ==
- Irreligion
- Irreligion in Mexico
- Irreligion in the United States
- Atheist
