= 500 años fregados pero cristianos =

1992 book by Rius

- Author: Rius
- Illustrator: Rius
- Cover artist: Rius
- Language: Spanish
- Genre: History, satire
- Published: 1992 (Grijalbo) (Spanish)
- Publication place: Mexico
- Media type: Print (Hardback & Paperback)
- Pages: 286
- ISBN: 970-05-0357-7
- OCLC: 27453282
- Dewey Decimal: 970.01/6 20
- LC Class: E123 .R585 1992

500 años fregados pero cristianos (English: 500 Years Screwed But Christian) is a 1992 illustrated book by Mexican cartoonist and writer Rius that was published by Grijalbo. The book is a sharp criticism of the Spanish conquest, the Catholic Church, and the current condition of the indigenous people of Latin America, who still are victims of humiliations and human rights violations. The idea of the book came about when the Mexican government started to make propaganda on the celebration of the 500 years of the discovery of the New World. The book tries to demystify the figure of Columbus and the Spanish missionaries who followed him.

The book is divided into nine chapters:

1. On the poor scum who was Columbus
2. What if the Aztecs had conquered Spain?
3. How the Spaniards mistook the Chinese civilization for the Mexican
4. On human sacrifices
5. On the Christianisation of the Natives
6. On the kind and Christian things made in the New World
7. The spiritual conquest; the first step toward perpetual underdevelopment
8. On the so-called "Holy" Inquisition
9. Where the reader may see the results of the civilization they gave us

== See also ==
- Cartoonism
- Atheism in Mexico
