= Guillermo Prieto =

19th-century Mexican writer and politician

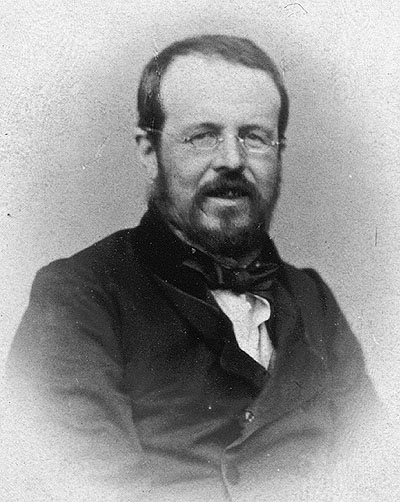

Minister of Finance
- In office 28 January 1858 – 5 August 1858
- President: Benito Juárez
- Preceded by: Melchor Ocampo
- Succeeded by: Melchor Ocampo
- In office 20 January 1861 – 5 April 1861
- President: Benito Juárez
- Preceded by: Melchor Ocampo
- Succeeded by: Francisco de P. Gochicoa

Minister of Foreign Affairs
- President: José María Iglesias

Personal details
- Born: 10 February 1818 Mexico City
- Died: 2 March 1897 (aged 79) Tacubaya, Mexico City
- Resting place: Dolores Civil Cemetery; 19.40679°N 99.20459°W
- Party: Liberal
- Spouse: Emilia Golard
- Occupation: Writer; journalist; politician

Guillermo Prieto Pradillo audio (10 February 1818 – 2 March 1897) was a Mexican novelist, short-story writer, poet, chronicler, journalist, essayist, patriot and Liberal politician. According to Eladio Cortés, during his lifetime he was considered Mexico's national poet, and his political allegiance to the Mexican liberals allowed him to serve as Minister of Finance and Minister of Foreign Affairs under different administrations.

In his writings he used several pen names, including Don Benedeno and Fidel.

== Early years ==
Prieto was born in Mexico City, the son of José María Prieto Gamboa and Josefa Pradillo y Estañol. His childhood was spent near the Molino del Rey ("King's Mill"), next to the historic Chapultepec Castle, since his father administered the mill and the associated bakery. When Prieto was 13 his father died and his mother had a nervous breakdown. Andrés Quintana Roo and Fernando Calderón took him under his protection, and he was thus able to continue his studies. After working in a clothing store and in the customs, he entered the Colegio de San Juan de Letrán.

Together with Manuel Toussaint Ferrer and the brothers José María y Juan Lacunza, he founded the Academia de Letrán in June 1836, with the aim of "the Mexicanization of literature". Quintana Roo was named "perpetual director" of the Academy.

Prieto began his career as a journalist and theater critic with El Siglo XX, publishing the column Los San Lunes de Fidel. He worked for El Monitor Republicano, and together with Ignacio Ramírez he founded the satirical periodical Don Simplicio. A supporter of the Liberal Party from a young age, he advocated its positions in the press and in his other writings.

== Political career ==
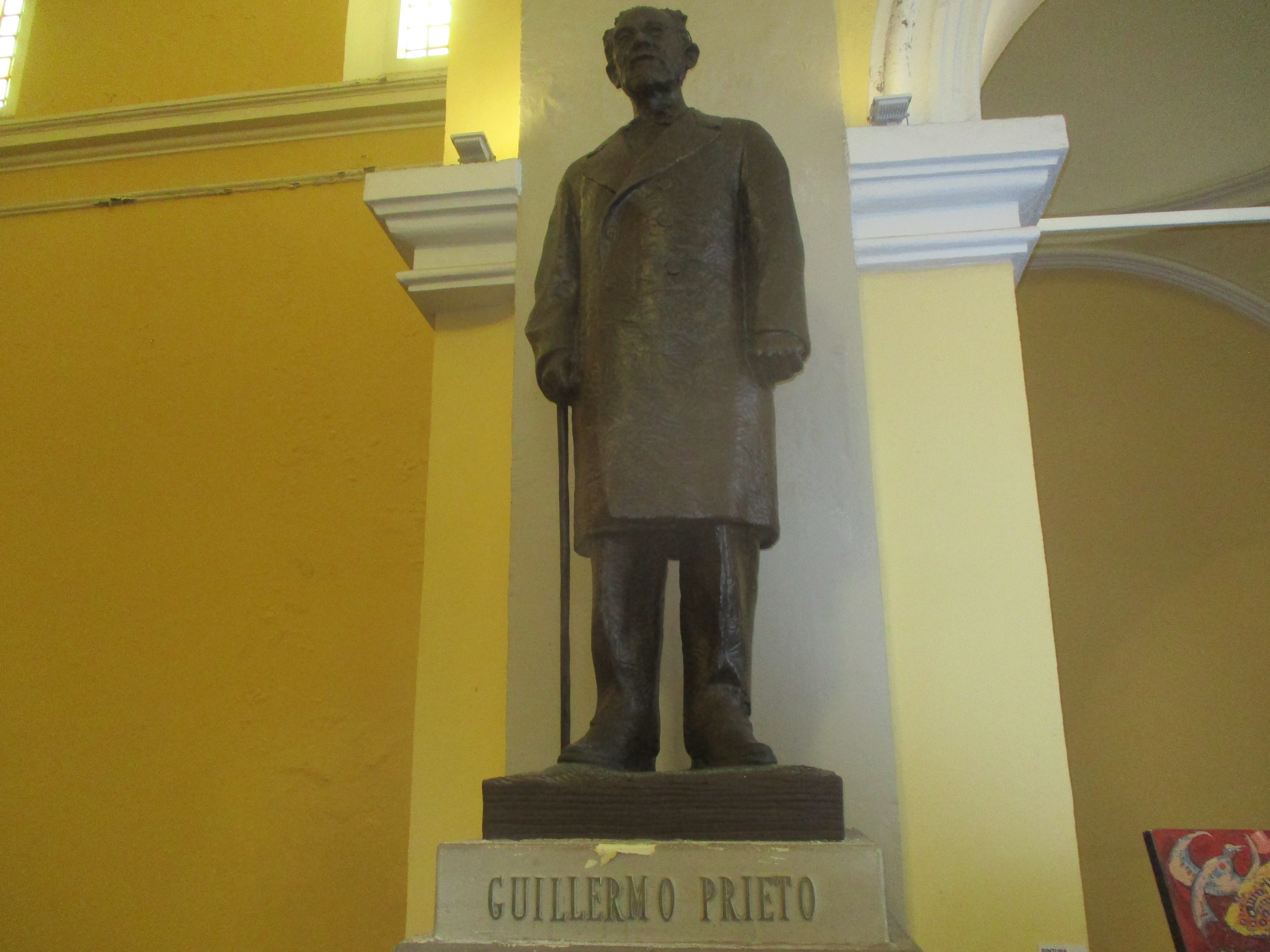
Monument in Veracruz

Prieto became personal secretary of Valentín Gómez Farías and Anastasio Bustamante, in succession. Under Bustamante he was editor of El Diario Oficial. He was minister of finance (hacienda) under Presidents Mariano Arista, Juan Álvarez and Benito Juárez. He was a congressional deputy 15 times and a representative of Puebla in the Constituent Congress of 1856-57. Together with other Liberals he supported the Plan of Ayutla, proclaimed 1 March 1854 and aimed at overthrowing dictator Antonio López de Santa Anna. For this he suffered temporary exile in Cadereyta, Guanajuato. As minister of finance under President Juárez, he accompanied the president into exile after the coup by Félix María Zuloaga.

During the subsequent Reform War, he saved the life of President Juárez in Guadalajara by stepping between the president and the guns of the rebelling guardsmen (14 March 1858). The guardsmen backed down and did not shoot. Prieto composed the satirical song of the Liberal army, "Los cangrejos" (The Crabs). It was to the tune of "Los cangrejos" that the Liberals under General Jesús González Ortega reentered Mexico City in January 1861, ending the Reform War.

After the return of the Republican government to Mexico City, Prieto, again minister of finance, published the decree of 5 February 1861 declaring that ecclesiastical property was and had always been property of the nation, and that as a consequence, contracts and other dealings celebrated by the clergy without the consent of the constitutional government were null and void.

He later served as minister of foreign relations in the government of José María Iglesias.

In 1890 the periodical La República held a poll to choose the most popular poet in Mexico. Prieto won easily. He was named by Ignacio Manuel Altamirano the "Mexican poet par excellence, the poet of the Fatherland".

According to Eladio Cortés, in his old age "he became somewhat of an eccentric in his manners and in his general appearance". He died in Tacubaya on 2 March 1897 at age 79, in the presence of his second wife, Emilia Golard, his children and his grandchildren.

== Works ==
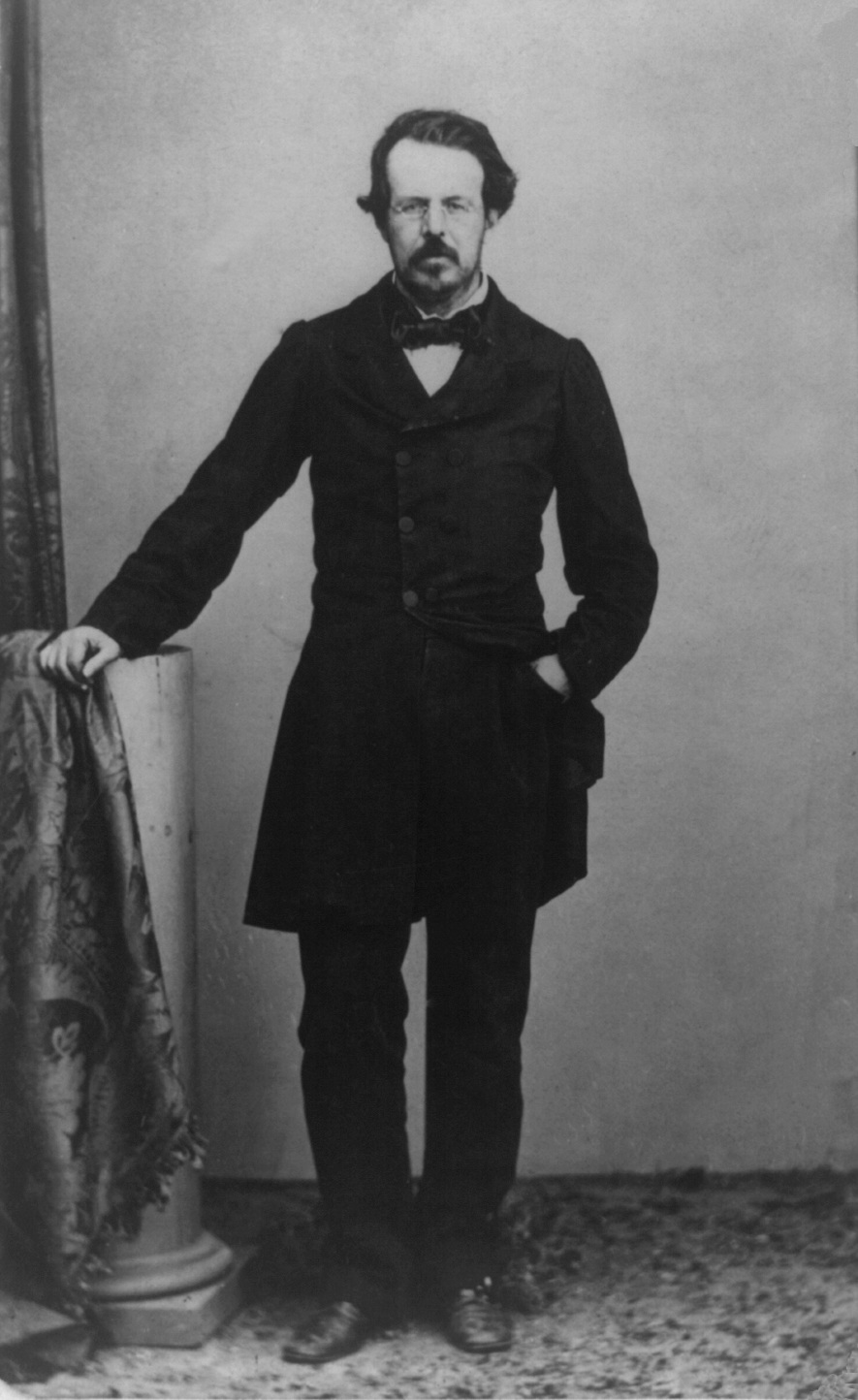
Full-length portrait of Guillermo Prieto.

A prolific author in many genres, with a festive and ironic style, Prieto's political passion is never far beneath the surface. He is remembered especially for the following works.

=== Poetry ===
- Versos inéditos (2 vol., Mexico City, Imprenta del Comercio de Dublán y Chávez, 1879), includes two sections: "Poesías varias" and "Poesías festivas y Musa callejera".
- Musa callejera (3 vol., Mexico City, Tipografía Literaria de Filomeno Mata, 1883), a retelling of Mexican folklore topics.
- El romancero nacional (Mexico City, Oficina Tipográfica de la Secretaría de Fomento, 1885), a patriotic epic.

=== Prose ===
- Memorias de mis tiempos de 1828 a 1840 (Paris, 1906)
- Memorias de mis tiempos de 1840 a 1853 (Paris, 1906)
- Viajes de orden supremo (unfinished, 1857)
- Viajes a los Estados Unidos (3 vol., Mexico City, Dublán y Chávez, 1878)
- Compendio de Historia Universal

=== Drama ===
- El Alférez (1840)
- Alonso de Ávila (1 May 1842)
- Los tres Boticarios
- El Susto de Pinganillas (19 March 1843)
- Patria y Honra
- La Novia del Erario
- Monólogo a mi Padre

As professor of political economy and later professor of national history at the Military College, Prieto also wrote Indicaciones sobre el origen, virtudes y estado que guardan actualmente las rentas generales de la federación mexicana (1850), Lecciones elementales de economía política (1871–1888), Lecciones de historia patria (1886) and Breve introducción al estudio de la historia universal (1888).
