= José María Luis Mora =

Mexican priest, historian, and politician (1794–1850)

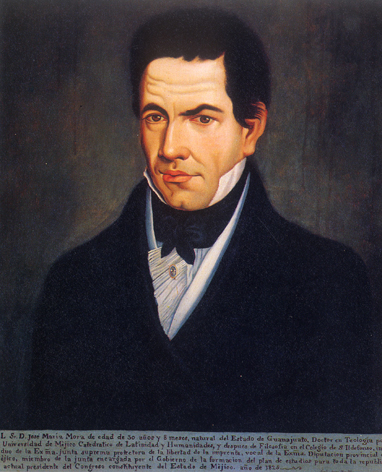

Deputy to the Constituent Congress of the State of Mexico
- In office 2 March 1824 – 1 March 1827

Personal details
- Born: José Luis Mora Lamadrid; 12 October 1794 Chamacuero, New Spain
- Died: 14 July 1850 (aged 55) Paris, France
- Cause of death: Tuberculosis
- Resting place: Panteón de Dolores
- Party: Liberal
- Education: San Ildefonso College

José María Luis Mora Lamadrid (12 October 1794 – 14 July 1850) was a priest, lawyer, historian, politician, and liberal ideologist. Considered one of the first supporters of liberalism in Mexico, he was the founder of the Liberal Party and fought for the separation of church and state. Mora has been deemed "the most significant liberal spokesman for his generation [and] his thought epitomizes the structure and the predominant orientation of Mexican liberalism."

== Early life ==
Born in 1794 in Chamacuero, during the Spanish colonial rule of Mexico, Mora came from a prosperous American-born Spanish (criollo) family from Guanajuato. His family lost its wealth during the 1810 revolt of Father Miguel Hidalgo, but Mora gained access to the prestigious ex-Jesuit academy of Colegio de San Ildefonso, in Mexico City, where he studied theology. In 1820, he received his doctorate and ordination to the priesthood.

He was a faculty member at the colegio and also served as librarian. He became a deacon in the archbishopric of Mexico, the seat of ecclesiastical power, but did not rise in the hierarchy. Blocked from advancement within the Catholic Church, he turned in 1821 to secular political matters and became a journalist. After Mexican independence in September 1821, he was a liberal politician shaping the newly sovereign state. In 1823, Mora advocated for the curricular reform of San Ildefonso to emphasize more modern approaches to learning in Spanish, rather than rote memorization and emphasis on Latin.

== Career ==
After the proclamation of the republic in Mexico in 1824, he was one of the drafters of the Constitution of the State of Mexico and was a member of the state congress. He criticized the Mexican Constitution of 1824 as incoherent because it protected Roman Catholicism as the sole religion, rather than allowing for religious freedom. He opposed the expulsion of Spaniards in Mexico and used the newspaper that he edited, El Observador, which was funded by the wealthy Fagoaga family, to support the continued presence of Spaniards in Mexico after its independence. As a journalist, he advocated for the Scottish Rite Masons. An opponent of the populist former insurgent leader Vicente Guerrero, who came to power in 1829, Mora therefore supported the coup by Anastasio Bustamante to oust Guerrero from the presidency. However, when Bustamante became a military dictator, Mora opposed him as well.

Mora's principal writings date from the 1820s. Mora's main sources of inspiration were initially John Locke and Benjamin Constant and later Gaspar Melchor de Jovellanos. In Constant, Mora saw a thinker who, in post-revolutionary France, sought to guarantee the rights of the individual against the strength of popular sovereignty, which he opposed because it led to the bloody excesses of the French Revolution and favoured a constitutionalist system instead. Within such a system, the most important individual freedoms were protected from both the government and the whims of the masses. Mora initially saw giving political power to Mexican property-holders as a safeguard to personal liberty, but then realized that their vested interests allied them with the church and the largely conservative Mexican army. Those interest groups were opposed to reform and so he increasingly saw as necessary the use of force against them.

The centralizing 18th-century Spanish policies of the Bourbon monarchy led Mora to take inspiration from Jovellanos. The American historian Charles A. Hale contends that Mora's drive to use the strong state to effect reform undermined basic tenets of liberal thought such as individual rights and laissez-faire.

Owing to ongoing political unrest, Mora became disillusioned with constitutionalism and therefore increasingly focused his sights on breaking the privileged position of the church and the army. Both for fiscal and ideological reasons, he was in favour of expropriating the church's property, which controlled but did not use its land. Mora wanted to continue reducing the church's privileged position in the constitution and also sought religious freedom and secular education. When legislation to limit the church's power was defeated in 1831, the Zacatecas governor held a contest, which Mora won, with a prize of 2,000 pesos for contestants to write essays on the topic of the government's right to expropriate church property, a contest Mora won.

Mora supported Vice-President Valentín Gómez Farías, who was Antonio López de Santa Anna's running mate. Since Santa Anna had no interest in actually serving as president, Gómez Farías was effectively in power and initiated a reform program. Gómez Farías appointed Mora to reform education, and Mora opened the first secular school in Mexico City. However, conservatives and the military, led by Santa Anna, opposed Gómez Farías's reform program and forced him to resign in early 1834.

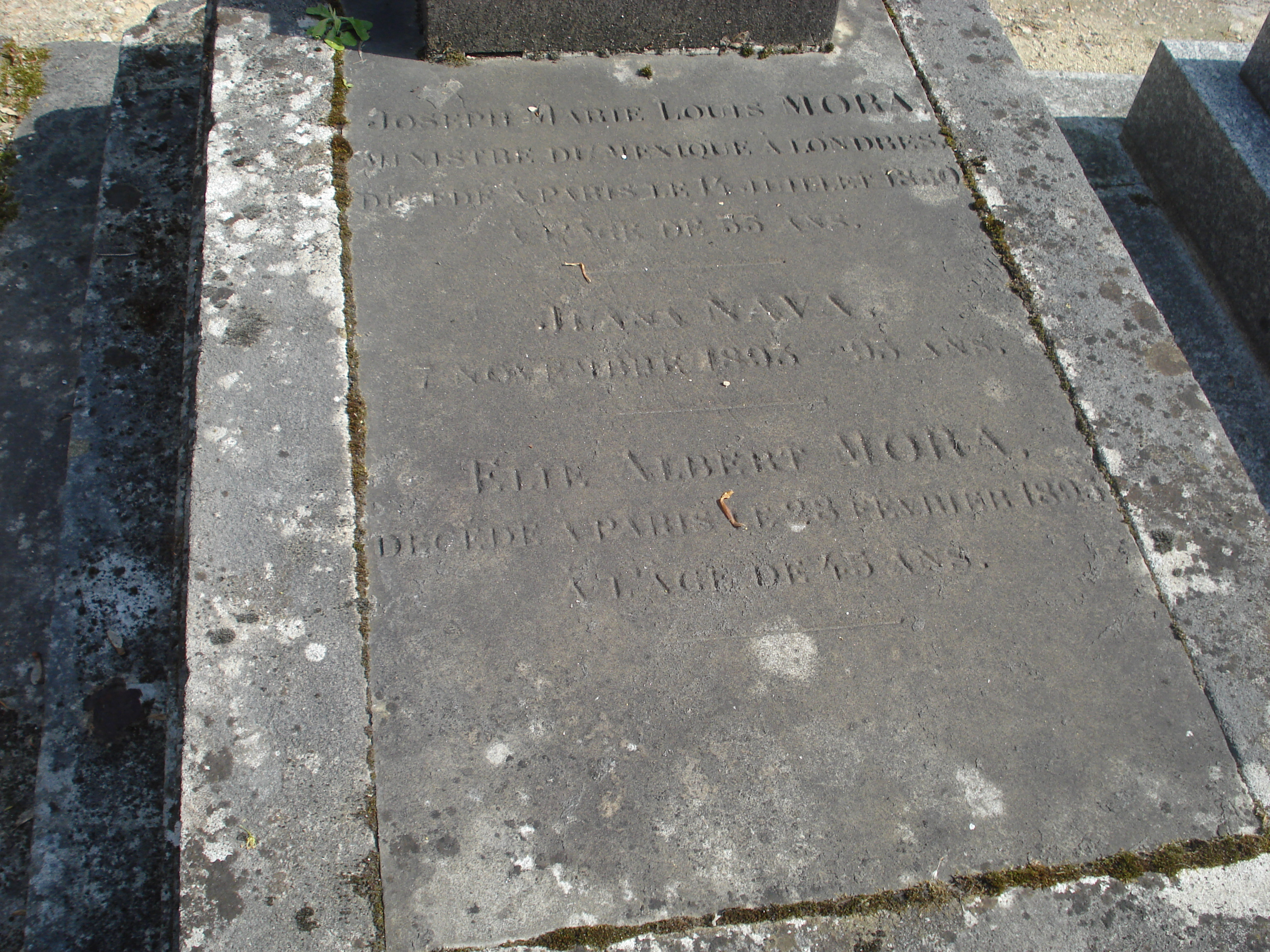
The grave of Jose Maria Luis Mora in Montmartre Cemetery

As a result, Mora went into self-exile to live in Paris, France, but continued to comment on the political events in his homeland. In 1844, President José Joaquín de Herrera appointed him as ambassador to the United Kingdom. In 1846, after returning to power, President Gómez Farías asked Mora to return to Mexico, but Mora was prevented from doing so by the Mexican–American War. The war shocked Mora, who admired the American political system. Even in 1848, after the war, he could not return to Mexico because of health issues, especially tuberculosis. He died on the French national holiday (July 14), 1850, in Paris.

In exile, Mora began writing what was envisioned to be a four-volume history of Mexico. In it, he articulated particular views on Mexico's past with relevance to the current political situation. He was an opponent of all forms of demagoguery but saw the 1810 uprising of Father Miguel Hidalgo y Costilla, which sparked the Mexican War of Independence, as a necessary evil.

== Works ==
- Memoria que para informar sobre el origen y stado actual de las obras emprendidas para el desagüe de las lagunas del valle de México. Mexico 1823.
- A los habitantes del estado de México su congreso constituyente. Texcoco 1827.
- Catecismo político de la federación mexicana. Mexico 1831
- Disertación sobre la naturaleza y aplicación de las rentas y bienes eclesiásticas, y sobre la autoridad a que se hallan sujetos en cuanto a su creación, aumento, sustencia o supresión. Mexico 1833.
- Méjico y sus revoluciones. 3 vols. Paris 1836.
- Obras sueltas, 2nd edition. Mexico: Porrúa 1963.

== Legacy ==
Compared to Mora's contemporary, Lucas Alamán, the chief conservative spokesman and prolific writer, Mora produced a slim output of works. He ceased writing in 1837 with the publication of his history of Mexico. However, Mora's ideas would later be followed by a generation of liberal politicians. During the Liberal Reform after the ouster of the conservative Santa Anna, the liberals dramatically changed the face of Mexico.

There is a museum in Mora's hometown of Chamacuero (now Comonfort, Guanajuato). His remains, on 24 June 1963, were interred at the Rotunda of Illustrious Persons.

== External sources ==
- El clero de hace casi dos siglos a la luz del presente
- 14 de julio de 1850. - Muerte de don José María Luis Mora, político e historiador.
- Presentacion de Chantal Lopez y Omar Cortes a la edicion cibernetica del Catecismo politico de la Federacion Mexicana de Jose Maria Luis Mora, Captura y diseño, Chantal Lopez y Omar Cortes para la Biblioteca Virtual Antorcha
- Antología de José María Luis Mora | PDF | Principios éticos | Gobierno
- Autores: José María Luis Mora
- Archivo de José María Luis Mora
