= Liberal Party (Mexico) =

Defunct left-wing political party in Mexico (1822–84)

Liberal Party Partido Liberal
- Founder: José María Luis Mora and Valentín Gómez Farías (co-founder)
- Founded: 1833–1834
- Dissolved: 1905 (see Mexican Liberal Party)
- Headquarters: Mexico City
- Ideology: Liberalism (Mexican); Federalism; Republicanism; Before 1876: Radicalism; Anti-clericalism; After 1876: Pro–Porfirio Díaz; Caudillismo; Positivism; After 1884: Liberal Autocracy; Militarism
- Political position: Before 1872: Left-wing; 1872–1876: Centre-left; 1876–1884: Centre-right; After 1884: Right-wing
- Colors: Red

The Liberal Party (Spanish: Partido Liberal, PL) was a loosely organised political party in Mexico from 1822 to 1911. Strongly influenced by French Revolutionary thought, and the republican institutions of the United States, it championed the principles of 19th-century liberalism, and promoted republicanism, federalism, and anti-clericalism. They were opposed by, and fought several civil wars against, the Conservative Party.

== History ==
The federalist Constitution of 1824 represented a triumph for liberal thought. During the First Mexican Republic era, the party's chief ideologists were Lorenzo de Zavala and José María Luis Mora. When President Valentín Gómez Farías sought to pursue an anti-clerical campaign in 1833, among other liberal reforms, his government was overthrown, and the triumphant conservatives replaced the constitution with the Siete Leyes inaugurating a decade of the Centralist Republic of Mexico.

By the time the federalist constitution was restored during the Mexican–American War, a new generation of liberals had grown to public prominence. After a constitutional convention was inaugurated in 1856, men such as Melchor Ocampo, Benito Juárez, Ignacio Ramírez, and Miguel Lerdo de Tejada, pursued unprecedented liberal reforms, including a continuation of the anti-clerical measures which were first attempted in 1833. These measures would be known as La Reforma and ultimately be codified in the Constitution of 1857. The War of Reform with conservatives ensued and the conflict blended into the Second French intervention in Mexico and the establishment of the Second Mexican Empire. Still, it ended with a decisive liberal triumph in 1867.

Porfirio Díaz, who became president in this era, had been a noted partisan of the liberals during the era of La Reforma, and even as he became in practice a dictator for life, his administration, and his intellectual supporters the Cientificos, continued to view themselves as the progressive heirs of La Reforma. The Constitution of 1857 would remain in effect until the Mexican Revolution.

== Ideology ==
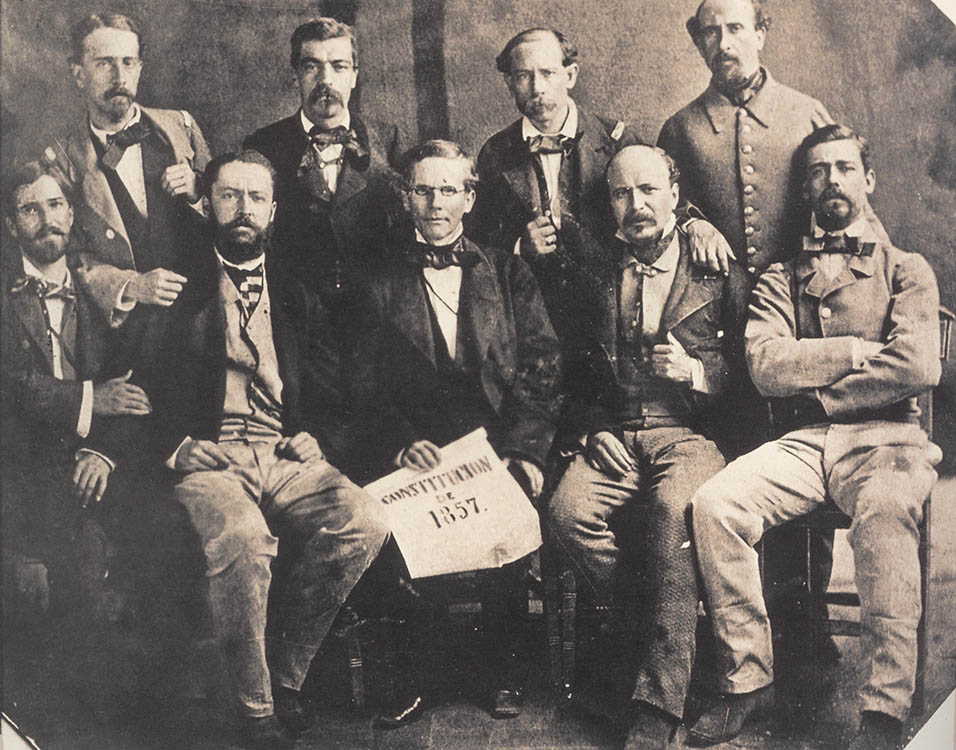
Liberals posing with a copy of the Constitution of 1857.

=== Federalism ===
The Liberals supported organizing the nation as a federation where each state contained an element of sovereignty shared with the federal government. The liberal Spanish Constitution of 1812, promulgated during the last years of colonial rule, divided New Spain into provincial deputations with popularly elected assemblies. Federalism can trace itself back to these provincial deputations or committees which fostered a spirit of provincialism and formed local political oligarchies reluctant to relinquish their newfound influence. Jalisco, the states of the North, and Yucatán were already beginning to form their own prominent local identities during colonial times. The Mexican provinces of Central America broke away on their own during the fall of the First Mexican Empire.

A de facto state of federalism already existed during the Supreme Executive Power, tasked with drafting the first constitution for independent Mexico. The arguments for integrating federation into the new constitution prevailed, motivated by the long struggle during the war of independence to seek as much autonomy as possible, and also an eagerness to reap the salaries that would accompany local bureaucracies.

Federalism would end for the moment in 1836, when the Conservatives promulgated the Siete Leyes, which replaced the states with departments controlled from Mexico City. In response, many states revolted against such an arrangement which led to the secession of Texas and eventually Yucatan. Revolts to secede or to restore the Liberal system of federalism would continue to agitate the Conservative Centralist Republic of Mexico to its very end, and the Constitution of 1824 would be restored in 1846 after the outbreak of the Mexican–American War.

The Plan of Ayutla overthrew the dictatorship of Santa Anna and brought a Liberal government to power in 1853. A motion to once again restore the Constitution of 1824 failed by one vote, and work once again began on drafting a new constitution. The subsequent Constitution of 1857 would once again be federalist, and would remain in effect until the Mexican Revolution in the early twentieth century.

=== Anti-Clericalism ===
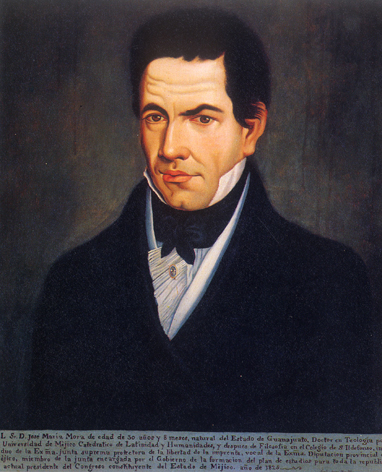
José María Luis Mora one of the first Mexican advocates of disestablishment.

Liberal efforts at disestablishing the Catholic Church began with the liberal presidency of Valentín Gómez Farías in 1834. The government shut down church schools, assumed the right to make clerical appointments to the church, and shut down monasteries. It was at this point that the government began proposing the nationalization of church lands as well. The Liberal governor of Mexico State, Lorenzo de Zavala would also carry out anti-clerical measures, including the suppression of monasteries. Conservative backlash led to the fall of the Gómez Farías administration.

The issue of nationalizing church lands was brought up again in 1847 by Gómez Farías once more who had once again found himself in the presidency during the Mexican–American War. This time Gómez Farías urged the nationalization of church lands as a means of funding the war effort, but the efficacy and prudence of such a measure was questioned by Conservatives, even by moderate liberals. There were clashes in the cabinet over the matter, and another Conservative revolt known as the Revolt of the Polkos once again toppled Gómez Farías.

A final and ill-fated Conservative effort to fight back against the anti-clerical measures of the Liberal Party took place during the pivotal La Reforma period which was inaugurated by the Plan of Ayutla that brought the liberal Juan Alvarez to power. This time it was not only the nationalization of church lands, but the question of religious freedom, and the jurisdiction of canon law over clergy that was brought to fore during the discussions regarding the drafting of the Constitution of 1857. Church properties not related to religious functions were nationalized, priests remained under the jurisdiction of canon law only in non-civil cases, and for the first time a Mexican Constitution did not declare Catholicism as the state religion.

Conservative backlash would trigger the Reform War, and it was during the war that the liberal president Benito Juárez went much further than the earlier reform measures by nationalizing all the remaining church properties in order to fund the war effort. The Conservatives would eventually lose the war in 1860, and the liberal measures remained entrenched.

=== Republicanism ===
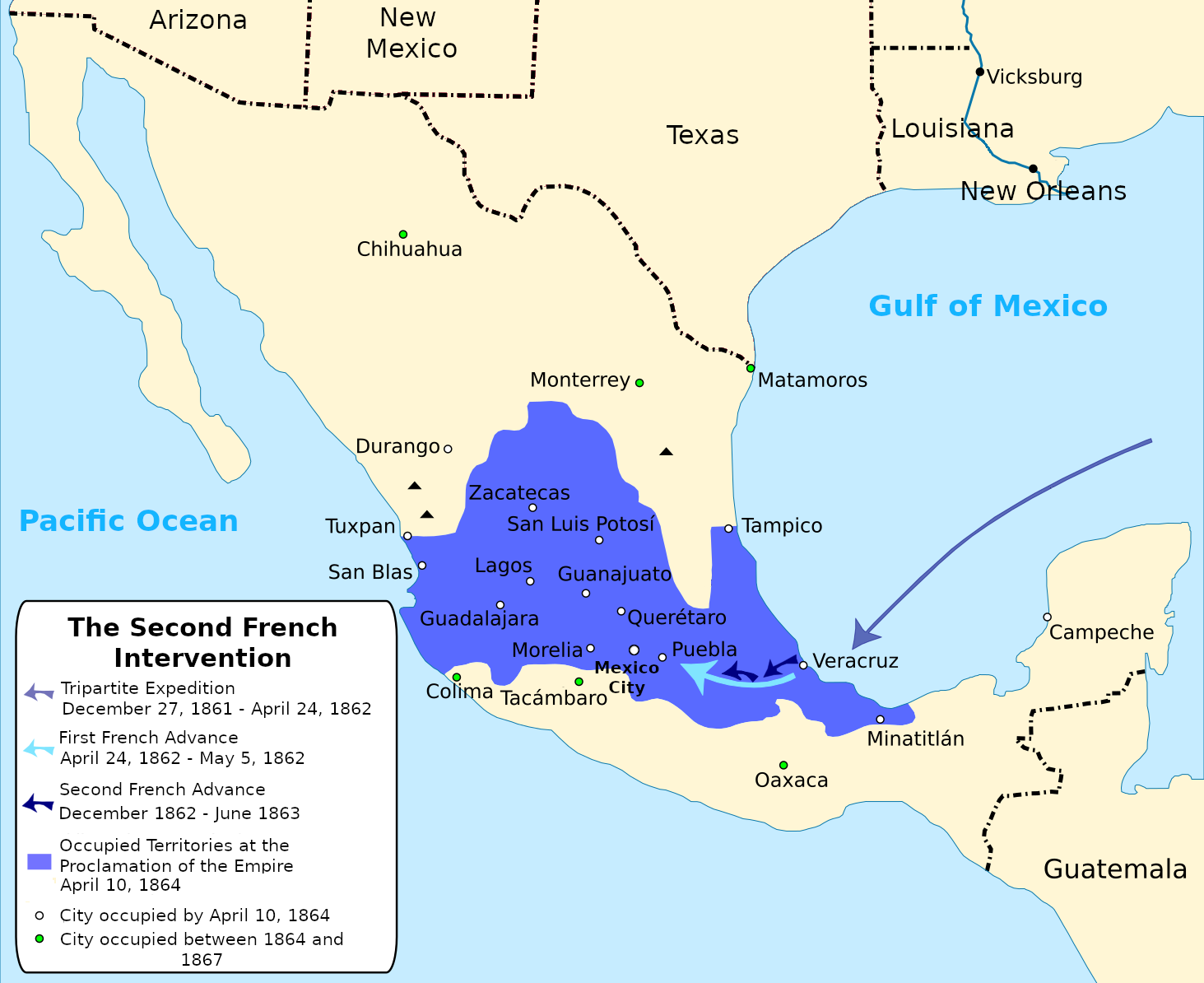
Map of the Second French Intervention in Mexico aimed at overthrowing the Second Federal Republic of Mexico and replacing it with a French aligned monarchy.

The Liberal Party was staunchly republican throughout its entire existence which did not always put it in opposition to the Conservative Party. Both parties joined in condemning José María Gutiérrez de Estrada when he suggested in 1840 that Mexico ought to invite a foreign monarch to establish a Mexican monarchy. Mexican historian Justo Sierra has argued that the unpopularity of monarchy caused the Conservatives to endorse republicanism lest the Liberal Party be perceived as the only republican party.

In 1845, the perception that President Mariano Paredes was considering constitutional change towards monarchy triggered a storm of opposition in the liberal press. Many liberal newspapers began changing their names to support republicanism. El Monitor Constitucional (The Constitutional Monitor) changed its name to El Monitor Republicano (The Republican Monitor). El Siglo XIX (The Nineteenth Century) changed its name to El Republicano (The Republican). Carlos María de Bustamante began to publish a newsletter titled Mexico no quiere rey y menos a un extranjero, (Mexico doesn't want a king, let alone a foreign one).

Republican critics of Paredes also pointed out that monarchy was unsuitable to the country because Mexico had no nobility to support such an institution. "With powerful arguments they maintained that the idea of a monarchy in Mexico was not only contrary to the wishes of the Mexican people, but also one that was not at all feasible, there being no such thing as a nobility in the country." Even the Conservative statesman, Antonio de Haro y Tamariz, agreed with these points, sarcastically suggesting that the government start granting titles to generals.

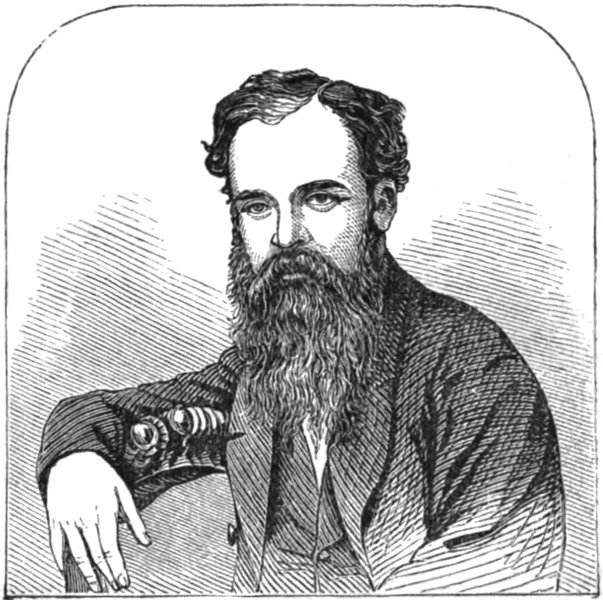
Matías Romero

The Liberal Party was in power when the Second French Empire launched an invasion of Mexico, the Second French Intervention, in 1861 with the intention of overthrowing the government of Mexico and replacing it with a monarchical client state, the Second Mexican Empire, a scheme that gained the collaboration of the Conservative Party, which previously however had expressed republican principles, causing the Liberal ambassador to the United States, Matías Romero to remark that "the French government has been and is, then, the true and only author of the project to establish a monarchy in Mexico, which can only be conceived...by persons who did not know the present situation of the republic and the ideas and tendencies of its people, or who believe the Mexican nation is an automaton with which one may do as one pleases." Five years of war would follow during which the French invaders struggled to gain control of the entire country, made worse by the end of the American Civil War in 1865, which allowed the United States to supply materiel to the Mexican Republic and place diplomatic pressure on France to leave the continent. Emperor Maximilian was captured, tried, and executed by the Liberal government in 1867.

== Liberals ==
=== Presidents ===
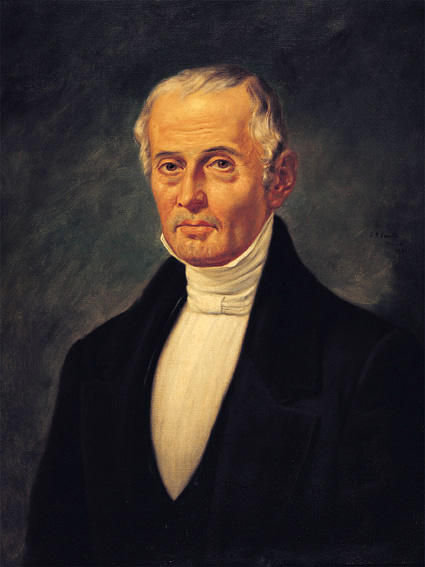
Valentín Gómez Farías

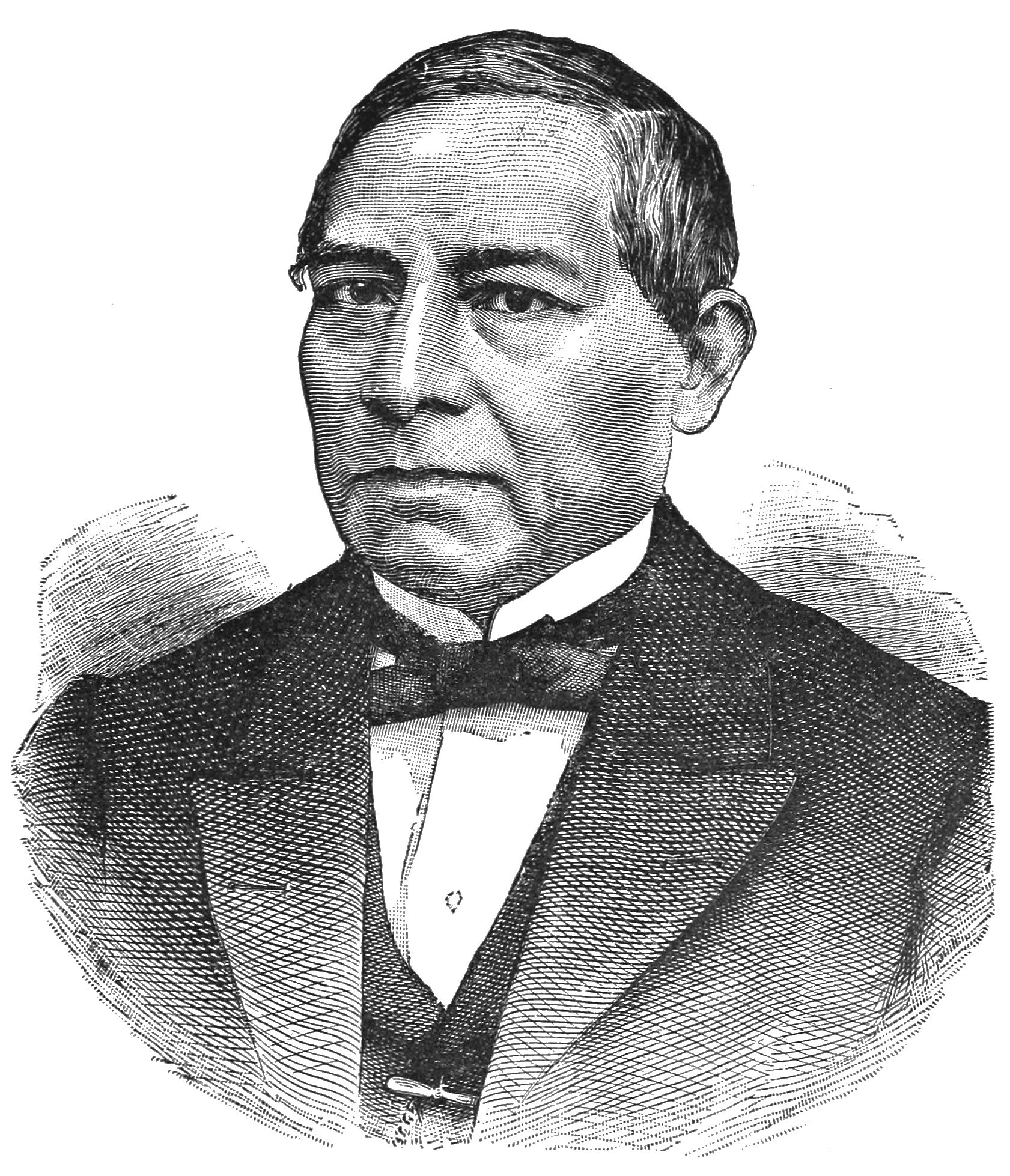
Benito Juárez

- Guadalupe Victoria – A leading insurgent commander during the Mexican War of Independence, Victoria would go on to become the first President of Mexico, and the only one to serve a full term until 1852.
- Vicente Guerrero – Second president of Mexico; also known for abolishing slavery, which had mostly ceased to exist in Mexico except for Texas.
- Valentín Gómez Farías – attempted a series of sweeping anti-clerical reforms during his first presidency in 1832, but was overthrown in response. He also briefly served as president during the Mexican–American War during which he was similarly overthrown. His reforms would later be more successfully implemented during La Reforma.
- Santa Anna – While known for repeatedly switching sides he began his public life as a liberal and was first elected to the presidency as a liberal in 1832. He also briefly returned to liberal principles at the beginning of the Mexican–American War when he played a role in restoring the Constitution of 1824.
- José Joaquín de Herrera – overthrown by hardliners in the years leading up to the Mexican–American War. The terrible results of the war vindicated his peace policy, and he was elected again immediately after the war, being the first Mexican president to complete his term since 1824.
- Pedro María de Anaya served two brief presidencies during the Mexican–American War.
- Mariano Arista – Succeeded José Joaquín de Herrera and was also known for a peaceful, moderate era of rule, before being overthrown over sweeping budget cuts.
- Juan Álvarez – Caudillo long based in the Tierra Caliente. He helped overthrow the last dictatorship of Santa Anna through the Plan of Ayutla inaugurating La Reforma and reaching the presidency. He later resigned hoping that the more moderate Ignacio Comonfort could better implement reforms.
- Ignacio Comonfort – The Constitution of 1857 was promulgated under his rule, but the subsequent backlash caused Comonfort to support a self coup known as the Plan of Tacubaya, which triggered the Reform War, and then caused Comonfort to back away from the Conservatives and resign the presidency.
- Benito Juárez – Oaxacan lawyer who later became governor of that state. He was among the liberals exiled in 1853 by Santa Anna, but returned to the nation during the Plan of Ayutla and was later made president of the Supreme Court which brought him to the presidency at the resignation of Comonfort. He remained president through the Reform War and the Second French Intervention before dying in office in 1872.
- Sebastián Lerdo de Tejada – Brother of the liberal statesman Miguel Lerdo de Tejada. Succeeded Juárez upon his death but was overthrown by another liberal, Porfirio Díaz. His presidency was also known for a program of railroad construction.
- Porfirio Díaz – A leading liberal commander during the Second French Intervention. His presidency would eventually develop into a decades long dictatorship known as the Porfiriato.

=== Military ===
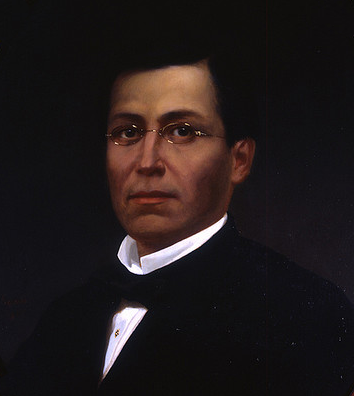
Ignacio Zaragoza

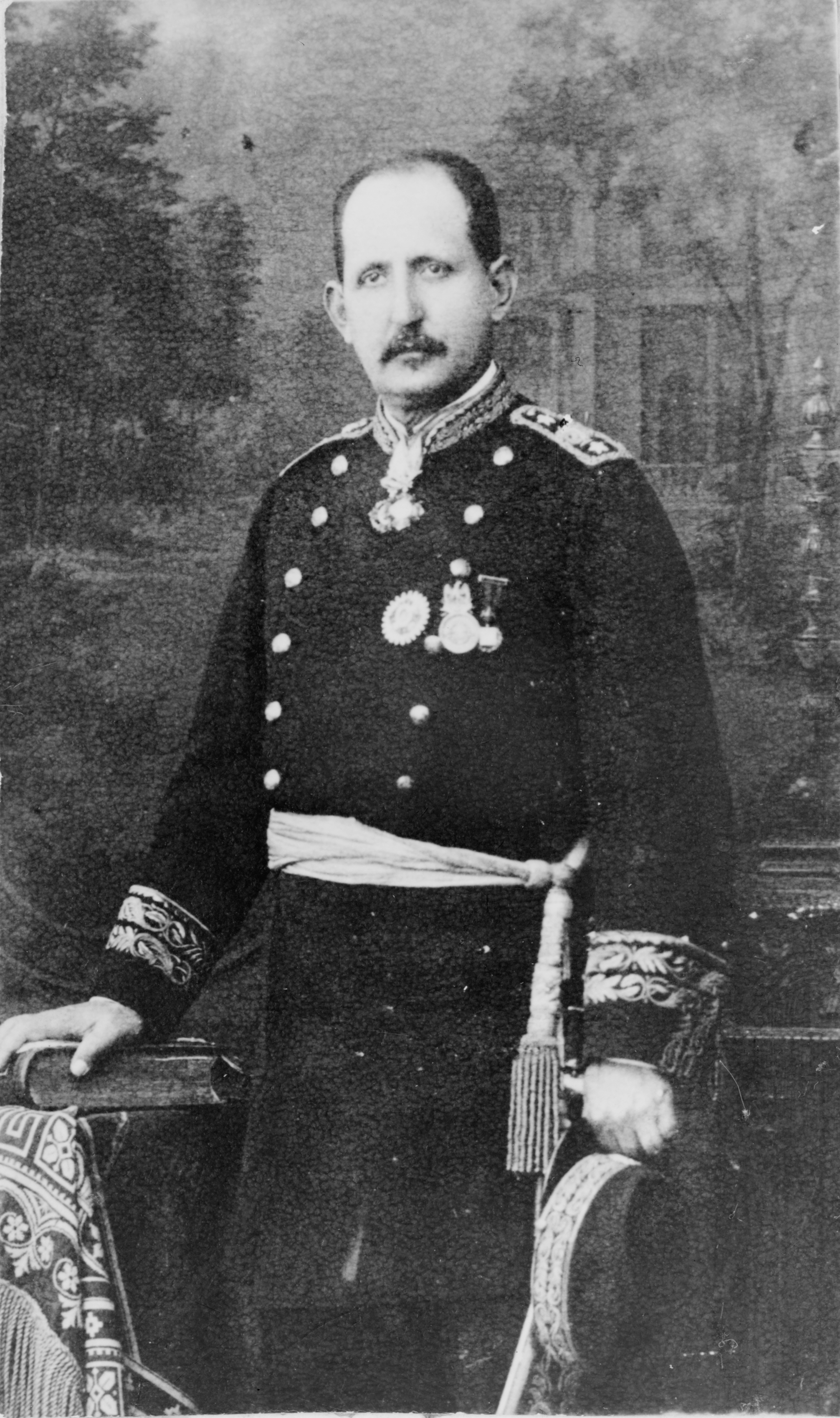
Ramón Corona

- Miguel Casulo de Alatriste – Lawyer and governor of Puebla who fought for the liberals during the Reform War and the Second French Intervention. He was captured and executed during the latter.
- Manuel Cepeda Peraza – Liberal general who fought in the Reform War and the Second French Intervention
- Ramón Corona – General who served during the Second French Intervention who later served as Minister to Spain.
- Santos Degollado – Governor of Jalisco who served in the cabinet of President Juárez, and was later thrust into military command with the outbreak of the Reform War. He was not known for his military skill and was later killed in pursuit of the Conservative General Leonardo Márquez shortly after the end of the Reform War.
- Luigi Ghilardi – Italian mercenary who fought in various European conflicts in the cause of republicanism. He traveled to Mexico to fight for the liberals in the Reform War and in the Second French Intervention. During the latter he was captured and executed by the French.
- Jesús González Ortega – Fiercely anti-clerical Governor of Zacatecas during the Reform War. He later fought for the liberals during the Second French Intervention and contested the claims of Benito Juarez to the presidency.
- Ignacio de la Llave – Governor of Veracruz who later fought for the liberals during the Reform War and the Second French Intervention. He died in combat during the latter.
- Pedro José Méndez – general who lead guerillas during the Second French Intervention
- José María Arteaga – He began his military career during the Mexican–American War and was later Governor of Queretaro and Governor of Jalisco. He fought for the liberals in the Reform War and the Second French Intervention. In the latter he was captured and executed by the French.
- José María Jesús Carbajal – Tejano supporter of Federalism who opposed Santa Anna, but refused to aid the Texas Revolution. He later supported the Liberals during the Reform War and the Second French Intervention. He served as the governor of Tamaulipas.
- José María Chávez Alonso – Journalist and publisher who later served as a deputy in the congress which drafted the Constitution of 1857. He fought in the Reform War and the Second French Intervention. During the latter he was captured and executed by the French.
- José María Patoni – Governor of Durango with a background in mining who led liberal troops during the Reform War and the Second French Intervention.
- Gregorio Méndez Magaña – Governor of Tabasco during the Second French Intervention during which he succeeded in expelling the French from his state.
- Pedro Ogazón – Liberal commander during the Reform War and the Second French Intervention who later went on to serve as Minister of War under President Porfirio Díaz.
- Carlos Salazar Ruiz – General who fought in the Reform War and the Second French Intervention, in the latter of which he was captured and shot by the French.
- Ignacio Pesqueira – governor of Sonora and general who fought against the French during the Second French Intervention.
- Agustina Ramírez – Mother of twelve who sent her sons to join the military during the Second French Intervention.
- Nicolás Régules – Spanish-Mexican general who fought in the Reform War and in the Second French Intervention.
- Antonio Rosales – Brigadier general during the Reform War and the Second French Intervention.
- Nicolás Romero – Businessman and later guerilla leader who fought in the Reform War and the Second French Intervention. He was captured and executed during the latter.
- Leandro Valle Martínez – Liberal diplomat and general during the Reform War who died in pursuit of Conservative General Leonardo Márquez.
- Ignacio Zaragoza – Liberal commander during the Reform War and the Second French Intervention. He is best known for defeating the French at the Battle of Puebla.
- Juan Zuazua – Distinguished himself during the Mexican–American War and the Reform War

=== Statesmen ===
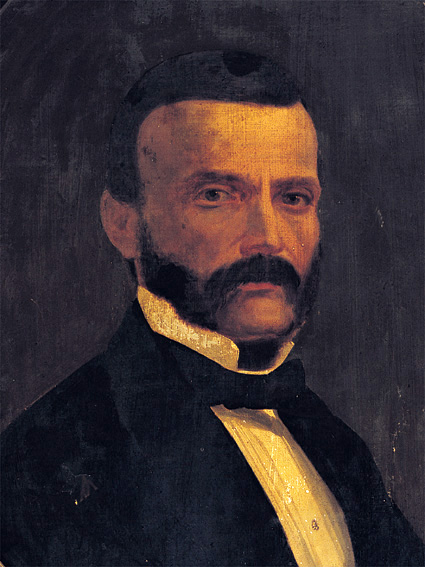
Miguel Lerdo de Tejada

- Manuel Doblado – Leading statesman during the Revolution of Ayutla; was later the Liberal Minister of Foreign Relations during the Second French Intervention.
- Miguel Lerdo de Tejada – Leading statesman during La Reforma. Drafted the Ley Lerdo. He was also brother of the president Miguel Lerdo de Tejada.
- José María Lafragua – Liberal congressman and later minister who served under President Ignacio Comonfort.
- Melchor Ocampo – Liberal governor of Michoacán who later joined the ministry during La Reforma. After the War of Reform, he was assassinated by the Conservative general Leonardo Márquez.
- José María Iglesias – lawyer, professor, congressman, and later Minister of the Treasury.
- Lorenzo de Zavala – Liberal writer, historian, and statesman who served as Governor of the state of Mexico. During the collapse of the First Mexican Republic, he gained infamy for supporting Texan Independence.
- Ezequiel Montes – Liberal jurist, professor, and statesman who served as foreign minister under President Ignacio Comonfort.
- Juan José Baz – governor of the Federal district and partisan of Valentín Gómez Farías.
- Ángel Albino Corzo – liberal congressman and governor of Chiapas.
- Juan Antonio de la Fuente – Governor of Coahuila and served as minister under multiple presidents during La Reforma.
- Manuel Alas Sardaneta y Pompa – Governor of the state of Mexico who went on to be president of the Supreme Court.
- Manuel Gutiérrez Zamora – Governor of Veracruz who protected President Juárez during the Reform War eventually turning Veracruz into the Liberal capital.
- Juan José de la Garza – Governor of Tamaulipas, general during the Reform War and the Second French Intervention and later minister plenipotentiary to El Salvador and Guatemala
- Ignacio Vallarta – Jurist and governor of Jalisco. He was present at the convention that drafted the Constitution of 1857
- Ponciano Arriaga – Lawyer and congressman who would go on to serve as Minister of Justice and President of the Chamber of Deputies.
- Santiago Vidaurri – Influential governor of Nuevo Leon and Coahuila and commander of the armies of the north during the Reform War. He abandoned the liberal president Benito Juárez during the Second French Intervention in Mexico and joined the Second Mexican Empire leaving to Mexico City to become an adviser to Emperor Maximilian. After the fall of the Empire he was captured and executed by the restored republic.
- José María Lacunza – He served as a Minister during the moderate liberal presidency of Jose Joaquin Herrera. He was also a faculty adviser to the liberal writer Ignacio Ramirez. During the Second French Intervention he accepted a post under the Second Mexican Empire for which he was exiled after the fall of the Empire.

=== Writers ===
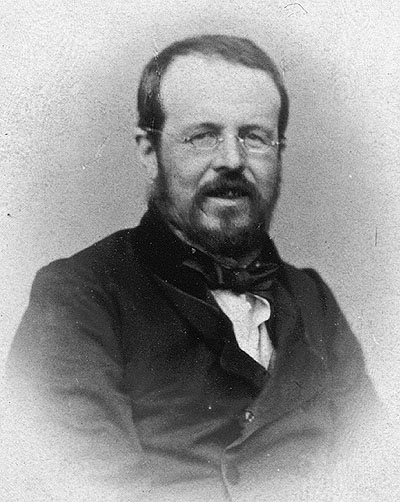
Guillermo Prieto

- Francisco Zarco – Writer who has been characterized as the greatest of the Liberal journalists. He wrote a detailed account of the debates during the drafting of the Constitution of 1857.
- José María Luis Mora – priest who served as one of leading liberal intellectuals during the First Mexican Republic. He served in congress and wrote on politics and history.
- Ignacio Ramírez – Atheistic writer, who edited many liberal newspapers, and later served as president of the Supreme Court.
- Guillermo Prieto – Liberal journalist and poet who would eventually serve in the ministry of several presidents, and played a notable role in La Reforma. He saved the life of President Benito Juárez in the early stages of the Reform War when they were both imprisoned in Guadalajara.
- Ignacio Manuel Altamirano – Indigenous Chontal lawyer, novelist, and journalist who took part in La Reforma. He would eventually also serve as president of the Supreme Court.
- Florencio Maria del Castillo – liberal writer, journalist, and congressman. He began his journalistic career writing for El Monitor Republicano.
- Gabino Barreda – physician and philosopher who helped implement educational reforms based upon Positivism. He was later made ambassador to the German Empire.
- Vicente Garcia Torres – journalist and founder of El Monitor Republicano.
