= Ponciano Arriaga =

19th-century Mexican lawyer and Liberal politician

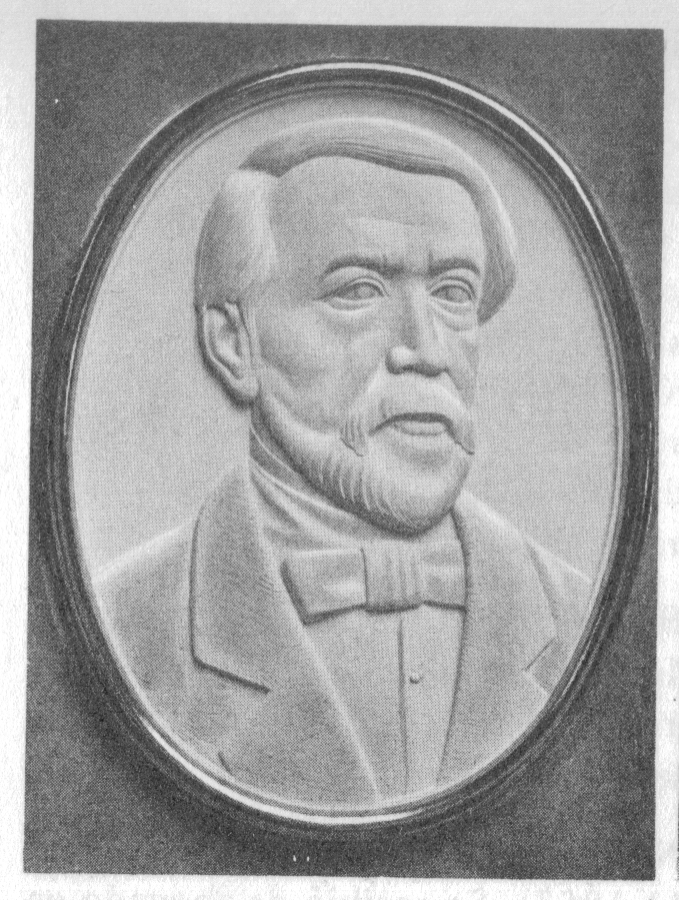

5th Minister of the Interior
- In office 1 December 1855 – 7 December 1855
- President: Juan Álvarez
- Preceded by: Francisco de P. Cendejas
- Succeeded by: Francisco de P. Cendejas

Personal details
- Born: José Ponciano Arriaga Mejía; 19 November 1811 San Luis Potosí, New Spain
- Died: 12 July 1865 (aged 53) Mexico City, Mexico
- Party: Liberal

José Ponciano Arriaga Mejía (1811–1865) was a lawyer and radical liberal politician from the Mexican state of San Luis Potosí.

== Biography ==
Arriaga rose to prominence in the late 1840s and is particularly known for pushing for the equality of people through property rights. Arriaga proposed a law in which the government would confiscate lands from the local hacienda owners and redistribute it to the local Indian population. Later in his career, Arriaga proposed landowners who possessed more than 15 square leagues, had to begin cultivating their land or forfeit it. Arriaga further proposed that anyone who did not own at least 50 pesos worth of land would be exempt from most taxes. The focus for Arriaga on equality through property rights stems from his argument that "despite the fundamental laws of the land, a privileged caste would be able to establish an aristocracy of wealth and monopolize land and political power."

Arriaga is also known for proposing a law that would establish a public attorney to represent the poor.

Ponciano Arriaga has served in multiple political positions including:

- Minister of justice
- Constitutional Congressman representing eight constituencies: Guerrero, Mexico State, Michoacán, Jalisco, Puebla, Zacatecas as well as San Luis Potosí and the Federal District.
- Secretary of the Interior
- Defensor de los Fondos de Beneficencia
- President of the Chamber of Deputies in 1856 and 1862-1863.

Arriaga, in his position as First Minister of the Interior, participated in writing the first draft of the 1857 Mexican constitution, later earning him the title of "Father of the 1857 constitution."

The Ponciano Arriaga International Airport in San Luis Potosí is dedicated to Arriaga's memory. Arriaga is entombed in the Mexican National Rotunda (Rotonda de los Hombres Ilustres).
