= Rius =

Mexican political cartoonist and writer

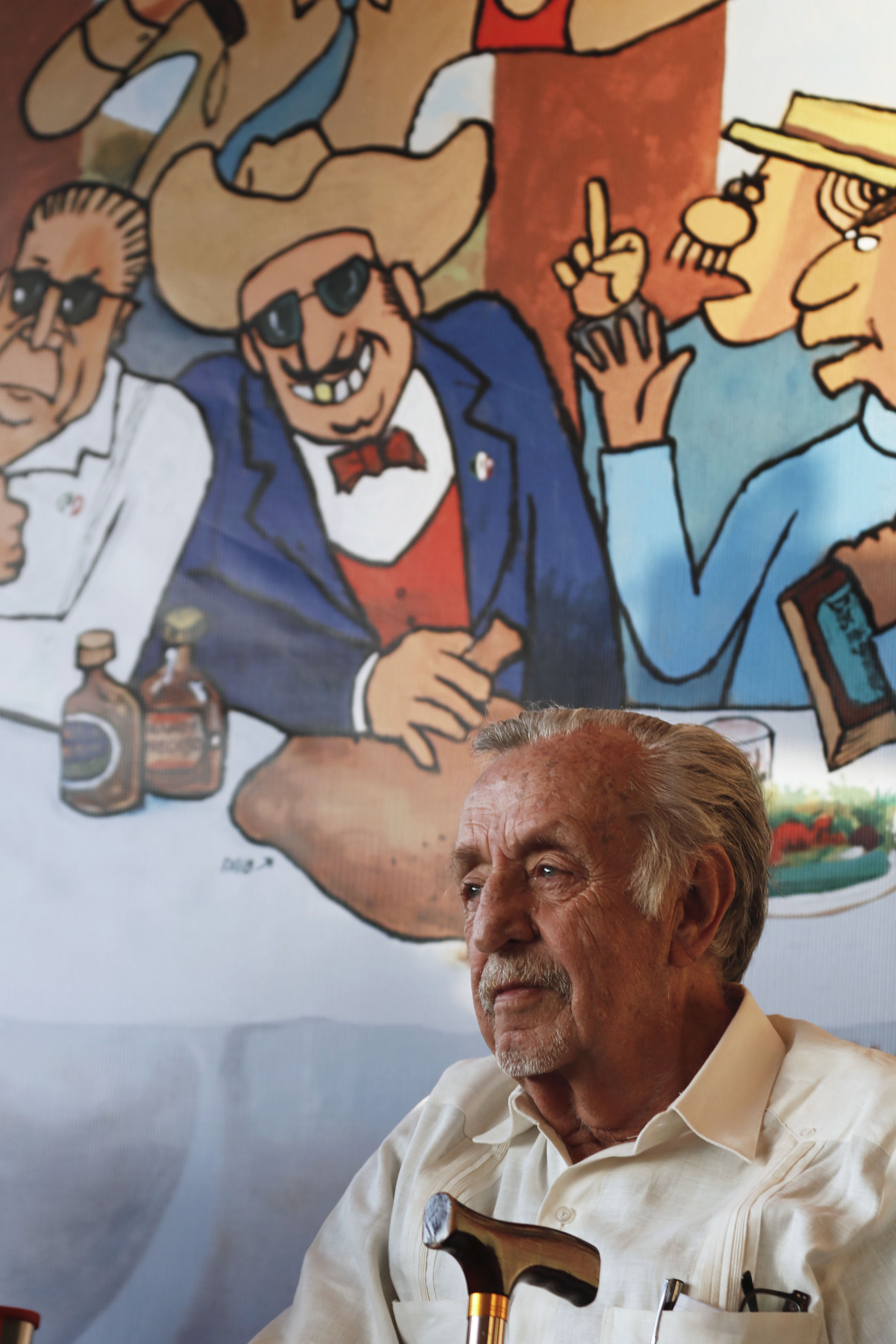
- Born: Eduardo Humberto del Río García; June 20, 1934 Zamora, Michoacán, México
- Died: August 8, 2017 (aged 83) Cuernavaca, Morelos, México
- Areas: Writer, Artist
- Notable works: Cuba for Beginners; Too bad for Cuba

Eduardo Humberto del Río García (June 20, 1934 – August 8, 2017), better known by his pen name Rius, was a Mexican intellectual, political cartoonist and writer born in Zamora, Michoacán.

One of the most popular Mexican cartoonists, Rius has written over a hundred books that remain widely popular, especially amongst his Mexican readers. Rius was a fierce political activist, and his progressive and left-wing point of view is often present in his writings, accompanied by a strong criticism about neoliberal Mexican doctrines, US Government policies, and the Catholic Church. He used to be an open advocate of the Cuban revolution as in Cuba for Beginners and a strong Soviet bloc sympathizer until the end of the Cold War.

After graduating from secondary school, he worked as a messenger and a cashier, sold soap and finally landed a job answering phones in a funeral home. He was recruited by “Ja Ja”, a humor magazine, after his doodles were noticed by a mourner who was familiar with the magazine’s editor. He adopted the pen name Rius. In the 1960s he began cartooning in magazines and newspapers, sometimes regarding political themes. He made two famous comics, Los Supermachos and Los agachados, which were a humorous criticism of the Mexican government. After his successes with these, he made many books, all illustrated and written by hand by him and covering a range of topics on politics, vegetarianism, and religion. His books have become popular mainly because of their humour, which attempts to reach the general reader, as well as for their simplicity and intellectual acuteness. They give an overview of their theme without becoming difficult.

In 1970, the first English edition of Rius's book Cuba para principiantes, a humorous comic strip presentation of Cuban history and revolution, was published in the United States as Cuba for Beginners. The book made no particularly great impact, but the 1976 English language publication of Marx for Beginners, a translation of his Marx para principiantes (1972), a comic strip representation of the life and ideas of Karl Marx, became an international bestseller and kicked off the For Beginners series of books from Writers and Readers and later Icon Books.

In the 1990s, he participated in two political humour magazines: El Chahuistle and El Chamuco (named after an insect plague and the devil, respectively, because they were harsh on politicians and religious leaders).

His success and long career have made him a reference point to the newer generations of political cartoonists in México. Mexican director Alfonso Arau made Calzonzin Inspector, a live action film based on characters appearing in Los Supermachos that was released in 1974.

He died on August 8, 2017, at the age of 83.

== Selected bibliography of Rius's books ==
- Economía para ignorantes (en economía). (Economics for Dummies (In Economics))
- Filosofía para principiantes (Desde Platón hasta hace rato) (Philosophy for Beginners: From Plato up to a Little While Ago)
- La panza es primero (The Stomach Is First)
- Marx para principiantes (Marx for Beginners)
- Puré de Papas (Mashed Potatoes/Pope Purée) (about the history of the heads of the Catholic Church; a play on words)
- 500 años fregados pero cristianos (500 years screwed but Christian)
- ABChe (about Che Guevara)
- Kama Nostra (referring to the Kama Sutra) Our Bed
- Cuba para principiantes (Cuba for Beginners)
- La Biblia: Esa linda tontería (The Bible: That Cute Nonsense)
- La deuda externa y cómo no pagarla (The External Debt and How Not to Pay It)
- Manual del perfecto ateo (Manual of the Perfect Atheist)
- Mis supermachos (My Supermachos)
- La Iglesia y otros cuentos (The Church and Other Tales)
- Lástima de Cuba (Too bad for Cuba)
- Los Panuchos (history of the National Action Party, or PAN)
- Machismo, feminismo y homosexualismo (Sexism, Feminism, and Homosexualism)
- El pequeño Rius Ilustrado (an illustrated Rius mini-dictionary)
- Rius para principiantes (Rius for Beginners)
- Herejes, ateos y malpensados (vol. I y II) (Heretics, Atheists, and Disingenous)
- Cómo dejar de comer (mal) (How to Stop Eating (Poorly))
- La mamá del Quijote (Quijote's Mom)
- De músico, poeta y loco... (Of Musician, Poet, and Crazy Person...)
- Cristo de carne y hueso (Christ of Flesh and Blood)
- Jesús alias el Cristo (Jesus Alias the Christ)
- Filatelia para cuerdos (Philatelia for Sane People)
- RecetaRIUS: 100 propuestas para salvar lo que queda de México (RecipeRIUS: 100 Proposals to Save What Is Left of Mexico)
- Con perdón de Doré (y de la Biblia) (Forgive Me, Doré (And Forgive Me, Bible))
- Su Majestad el PRI (His Majesty PRI)
- El católico preguntón (The Annoying Catholic)
- Pobrecito Japón (Poor Japan)
- Marihuana y otras debilidades (Marijuana and Other Weaknesses)
- Osama Tío Sam (Osama Uncle Sam)
- El libro de las malas palabras (The Book of Bad Words)
- El fracaso de la educación en México (The Failure of Mexican Education)
- El diablo se llama Trotsky (The Devil is Named Trotsky)
- El mundo del fin del mundo (The World of the End of the World)
- De aborto, sexo y otros pecados (Of Abortion, sex, and Other Sins)
- Descubriendo a Colón (Discovering Columbus)
- La cultura no muerde (Culture Doesn't Bite)
- El otro Rius (The Other Rius)
- La interminable conquista de México (The Endless Conquest of Mexico)
- El amor en tiempos del SIDA (Love in Time of AIDS)
- La droga que refresca (The Refreshing Drug) (about Coca-Cola)
- Cuba libre (The Free Cuba)
- ¡Ya te vimos, Pinochet! (Gotcha, Pinochet!)
- Diccionario de estupidez humana (The Dictionary of Human Stupidity)
- Sería católico jesucristo? (Would Jesus Christ Have Been Catholic?)
- MAS herejes, ateos y malpensados (MORE Heretics, Atheists, and Disingenous)
- La verdadera historia del tío Sam (The True History of Uncle Sam)
- Marihuana, cocaína y otros viajes (Marijuana, Cocaine, and Other Trips)
- El supermercado de las sectas (The Supermarket of Sects)
- Trukulenta historia del kapitalismo (The Trikky History of Kapitalism)
- La revolucioncita mexicana (The Little Mexican Revolution)
- TodoRius (AllRius)
- Votas y te vas (Vote and Leave)
- Horóscopos, tarot y otras tomadas de pelo (Horoscopes, Tarot, and Other Frauds)
- Atlas para niños y niñas (An Atlas for Children)
- Quetzalcóatl no era del PRI (Quetzalcoatl Wasn't with the PRI)
- Los agachados (The Crouched)
- Guia Incompleta del Jazz (Incomplete Guide to Jazz)
- Mao for Beginners – an English-only collaborative effort credited to “Rius & Friends”
