= Seth Haberman =

Seth Haberman is CEO of Sense Education, an artificial intelligence company that uses unsupervised machine learning technology, as well as bioinformatic algorithms, to identify how people solve open-ended problems. He was also the founder of VisibleWorld, a developer of viewer-customized television advertising.

Prior to founding Sense Education and Visible World, Haberman was founder of Montage Group, where he invented and licensed seminal non-linear editing technologies to all of the leading manufacturers of non-linear editing systems (such as Avid and Final Cut Pro). Montage’s innovative work developing its "MServer" software earned an Academy Award for technological achievement in 1987, an Emmy Award in 1993 for "Enabling Technology for Non-Linear Editing Systems Using Digital Images and Sounds", shared with EMC among others.

He has been Chair of the Video Gaming and Technology awards panel for the National Academy of Television Arts and Sciences, which awards the technology Emmy Awards.

He earned a BA in physics and math in 1981 from Columbia College, Columbia University.
