= Robert Haberman =

American socialist lawyer and activist

Robert Haberman (Iași, Romania, March 22, 1883–Lebanon, Pennsylvania, United States, March 2, 1962) was an American socialist lawyer and activist who lived most of his life in Mexico City and Yucatán working as the head of the Foreign Language Department of the Ministry of Education. Of Romanian Jewish origin, he helped introduce important socialist reforms to the Yucatán Peninsula.
