= Confessional state =

State which officially practices a particular religion

Confessional states Buddhism Eastern Orthodoxy Protestantism Catholicism Non-denominational Christianity Shia Islam Sunni Islam Non-denominational Islam

A confessional state is a state which officially recognises and practices a particular religion (also known as a state religion), usually accompanied by a public cult, ranging from having its citizens incentivised to do likewise through government endorsement to having public spending on the maintenance of church property and clergy be unrestricted, but it does not need to be under the legislative control of the clergy as it would be in a theocracy.

Over human history, many states have been confessional states. This is especially true in countries where Islam, Christianity, and Buddhism were the religions of the state. Until the beginning of the 20th century, many if not most nations had state religions enshrined in their respective constitutions or by decree of the monarch, even if other religions were permitted to practice.

However, there are many examples of large multicultural empires that have existed throughout time where the religion of the state was not imposed on subjected regions. For instance, the Mongol Empire, where Tengrism was the religion of the court, but not imposed on those ruled by the Mongols, the Achaemenid Empire and the Roman Empire before Constantine I, where regional clergies and practices were allowed to dominate as long as offerings were made to Roman Gods and tribute paid to Rome.

Religious minorities are accorded differing degrees of tolerance under confessional states; adherents may or may not have a set of legal rights, and these rights may not be accessible in practice. For example, in medieval Europe Jewish people suffered various degrees of official and unofficial discrimination; during the same period in Islamic states, non-Muslims or dhimmi were legally inferior to Muslims but in theory accorded certain protections.

In Europe, the 1648 Treaty of Westphalia institutionalized the principle of cuius regio, eius religio—that rulers of a state had the right to determine the religion of its subjects. This was in an effort to curb the religious warfare that had wracked Europe after the Protestant Reformation.

== Tensions based on inclusiveness in religious nationalism ==
In a 2002 Journal of Ecumenical Studies article, Practice in Religion, Ethnicity, and International Conflict Harvard Divinity School professor David Little identified "ethnic and religious" inclusiveness in religious nationalism causing tensions as well as shifts from ethnic to civic nationalism. He evaluated the religious nationalism of Christianity, with nationalism as "may [be understood] as the impulse of an ethnic group to claim the right to participate in the government of a given territory", presumably also manifesting in the form of state-level religious affiliation, and religious nationalism as "may mean the impulse of the group in question to invoke a religious warrant for its claim to such a right." Subscribing to "the literature [that it] is divided into two basic types: 'ethnic' and 'civic'", accepting that "religious people do perform [giving religious reasons for ethnocratic rule], thus contributing, it would appear, to the violence that so often attends one ethnic group's drive for political domination", Little nonetheless concludes that "throughout the course of Christian history" that in response to "Christians [that] advocate one or another version of ethnocratic rule", "[...] there are strong [Christian] dissenting voices that are dedicated to promoting ethnic and religious inclusiveness based on tolerance and equality in the civic order."

A danger from religious nationalism is that when the state derives political legitimacy from adherence to religious doctrines, this may leave an opening to overtly religious elements, institutions, and leaders, making the appeals to religion more 'authentic' by bringing more explicitly theological interpretations to political life. Thus, appeals to religion as a marker of ethnicity create an opening for more strident and ideological interpretations of religious nationalism.

== Modern times ==
Muslim world map of countries by state-level religious affiliation. Those practicing and recognising a state religion and above are confessional states.

The confessional state is largely gone in the Western World, although in the Middle East, the confessional state still commonly exists, as well as many post-partition of the Ottoman Empire states and Iran having established confessionalism. Today, many Muslim-majority countries have incorporated Islamic law in part into their legal systems. Islamic states which are not Islamic monarchies are usually referred to as Islamic republics, such as Pakistan and the previously mentioned Iran, both are moderately common in the Muslim world. A number of modern countries, such as Malaysia, have state religions; they usually also allow freedom of religion.

== Historical ==
=== Scotland ===
During the Scottish Reformation, in the beginning of Scottish Presbyterianism, the interpretation of various religious figures being rebuked by their superiors enabled a "radical" check and balance by Scottish covenanters to bind the monarch by law and subject them to divine authority.

=== United States ===
Several of the Thirteen Colonies were confessional states, although of different denominations, before the American Revolution; Connecticut remained one until 1818. Other American states required each town or individual to support some religious body, without the state deciding which one; but this was also abolished, the last instance being Massachusetts, which restricted the obligation in 1821 and ended it in 1843.

== Modern ==
=== England ===
The 1646 Westminster Confession of Faith Genevan approach associated with John Calvin was in favor of limiting from the Christian ruler the role of the church in administering discipline, up to excommunication, while affirming their duty to promote and protect true religion.

It persists, with reduced political power, as an Anglican confessional state.

=== Russia ===
Russia is formally secular but its government strongly promotes and relies on Eastern Orthodoxy and its values.

=== Costa Rica ===
A Catholic confessional state.

=== Egypt ===
In 2015, President Abdel Fattah el-Sisi of Egypt, with "his professed goal [...] to purge [Islam] of extremist ideas of intolerance and violence that fuel groups like al-Qaida and the Islamic State", "[used] government religious institutions like the 1,000-year-old al-Azhar, one of the most eminent centers of Sunni Muslim thought and teaching."

=== Indonesia ===
Indonesia is formally secular but a presidential edict enacted by Sukarno in 1965 explicitly stated that "the religions professed by Indonesians are Islam, [Protestant] Christianity, Catholic[ism], Hindu[ism], [Buddhism], and Kong Fuzi (Confucious)." Confucianism was banned during the New Order, while those not professing the other five religions were forced to convert to receive government service.

=== Poland ===
Poland is formally a secular state, with Article 25 of the Constitution of Poland guaranteeing the impartiality of public authorities in religious matters and the autonomy and mutual independence of the state and religious organisations. The Catholic Church in Poland nevertheless holds a prominent position in public life and has significant social and political influence. Some scholars have characterised Poland's system of church–state relations as lying between a secular and a confessional state.

== Modern theocratic ==
=== Saudi Arabia ===
Saudi Arabia is a state incorporating Islamic law in full into their legal system.

=== Vatican City ===
Vatican City is a Christian state whose legal system is rooted in canon law.

=== Pakistan ===
Pakistan is a former ethnic nationalist theocratic confessional state. In 1980, Pakistan's separate electoral system for different religions has been described as 'political Apartheid'. Hindu community leader Sudham Chand protested against the system but was murdered. In 1999, Pakistan abolished this system. Pakistan is a theocracy incorporating Islamic law in part, due to the state having retained most of the laws that were inherited from the British legal code that had been enforced by the British Raj since the 19th century.

== See also ==
- Confessionalism (politics)
- Confessionalism (religion)
- Separation of church and state
- Elite religion
- Divine rule
- State religion
- Theodemocracy
