= Federal Constitution of the United Mexican States of 1857 =

Fundamental law of Republican Mexico from 1857 to 1917

Political Constitution of the Mexican Republic
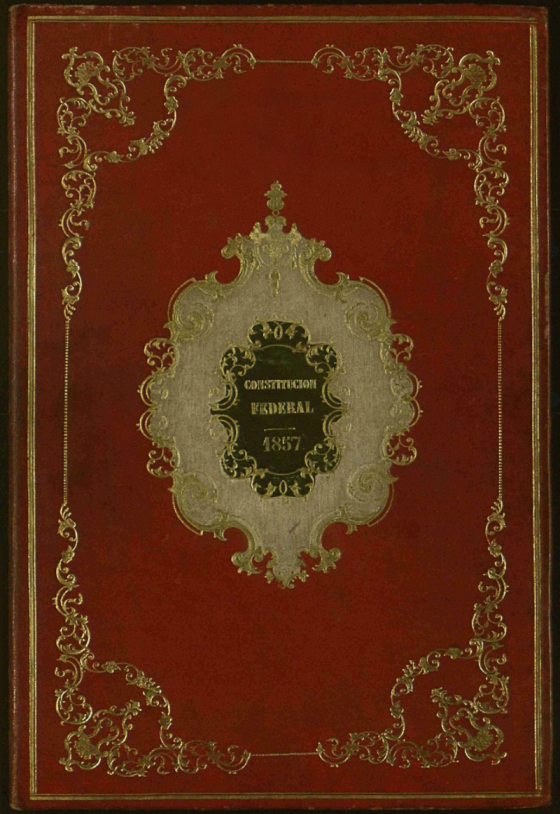
- Original front of the 1857 Constitution

Overview
- Jurisdiction: Mexico
- Created: 1856–1857
- Ratified: 5 February 1857; 169 years ago
- System: Constitutional presidential republic

Government structure
- Branches: 3
- Chambers: Unicameral, amended in 1874 to reestablish the Senate.
- Executive: President
- Electoral college: Yes, presidential elections are validated by the Deputies.

History
- First legislature: 7 September 1857
- Repealed: 5 February 1917
- Amendments: 32
- Last amended: 7 November 1911
- Location: Museo Nacional de las Intervenciones
- Author: 1857 Constituent Congress
- Supersedes: 1824 Constitution of Mexico
- Superseded by: 1917 Constitution of Mexico

The Political Constitution of the Mexican Republic of 1857 (Spanish: Constitución Política de la República Mexicana de 1857), often called simply the Constitution of 1857, was the liberal constitution promulgated in 1857 by Constituent Congress of Mexico during the presidency of Ignacio Comonfort. Ratified on February 5, 1857, the constitution established individual rights, including universal male suffrage, and others such as freedom of speech, freedom of conscience, freedom of the press, freedom of assembly, and the right to bear arms. It also reaffirmed the abolition of slavery, debtors' prisons, and all forms of cruel and unusual punishment such as the death penalty. The constitution was designed to guarantee a limited central government by federalism and created a strong national congress, an independent judiciary, and a small executive to prevent a dictatorship. Liberal ideals meant the constitution emphasized private property of individuals and sought to abolish common ownership by corporate entities, mainly the Catholic Church and indigenous communities, incorporating the legal thrust of the Lerdo Law into the constitution.

A number of articles were contrary to the traditional powers of the Catholic Church, such as the ending of Catholicism as official religion, the nationwide establishment of secular public education, the removal of institutional fueros (legal privileges), and the forced sale of Church property. Conservatives strongly opposed the enactment of the constitution, which polarized Mexican society. The Reform War (1858–1860) began as a result, with liberals winning on the battlefield over conservatives. The losing conservatives sought another way back into power, and their politicians invited Maximilian I of Mexico, a Habsburg, to establish a Mexican monarchy with the Church's support. The republican government-in-domestic-exile was headed by President Benito Juárez as the legitimate Mexican government under the constitution. With the ouster of the French and the defeat of the conservatives in 1867, the Restored Republic was again governed under the 1857 Constitution. The constitution was durable but its provisions not always followed in practice. It was revised in 1874 to create a Senate. It remained as Mexico's constitution until 1917 although many of its provisions ceased to be enforced.

== Background ==
Having overthrown the dictatorship of Antonio López de Santa Anna in 1855, liberals sought to implement their ideology in new laws and briefly had Juan Álvarez in the presidency. As established in Plan of Ayutla, he convened the Constituent Congress on October 16 to establish headquarters in Dolores Hidalgo and to draft a new constitution embodying liberalism. The following year, the incumbent president, Ignacio Comonfort, endorsed the call to move the headquarters to Mexico City.

The Congress was divided between two main factions. Most members were moderate liberals and planned to restore the Constitution of 1824 with some changes. Some of the prominent figures were Mariano Arizcorreta, Marcelino Castañeda, Joaquín Cardoso, and Pedro Escudero y Echánove. Their opponents the pure liberals, who wanted to make a completely-new constitution. Among them were Ponciano Arriaga, Guillermo Prieto, Francisco Zarco, José María Mata, and Santos Degollado. The discussions were heated and lasted over a year.

President Comonfort interfered through its ministers for the moderate faction, which he preferred. Despite opposition from the executive branch and the minority, pure liberals ensured that their proposals successfully included: the prohibition of purchase of property by ecclesiastical corporations, the exclusion of the clergy in public office, the abolition of ecclesiastical and military fueros^{[a]} (Juárez Law), and freedom of religion.

Those reforms were contrary to the interests of the Catholic Church. During the sessions of Congress, an insurrection for the clergy supported by conservatives, the staunchest opponents of the liberals, gathered force in Zacapoaxtla and Puebla. Comonfort sent federal troops and defeated the rebels.

The Constitution was promulgated on February 5, 1857, but the clergy threatened that whoever swore the Constitution would be excommunicated.

== Major provisions ==
The Constitution of 1857, with 8 titles and 128 articles, was similar to the 1824 Constitution. Both federalism and representative republicanism were again implemented, and there were 23 states, a territory, and the federal district. It supported the autonomy of municipalities in which each state was divided politically. These were most relevant articles:

- 2. Abolition of slavery. It was ratified by the Decree of Abolition of Slavery on September 15, 1829, by President Vicente Guerrero.
- 3. Free public, secular education.
- 5. Freedom of vocation, with a ban on contracts with loss of freedom for the sake of work, education, or religious vows.
- 7. Freedom of speech.
- 10. Right to bear arms.
- 12. Abolition of titles of nobility.
- 13. Prohibition of privileges to individuals or institutions or of special courts (Juárez Law).
- 22. Prohibition of cruel and unusual punishment or the confiscation of property.
- 23. Abolition of death penalty for political prisoners, (later modified to permit the execution of traitors under the law of 12 April 1869).
- 27. No civil or ecclesiastical corporation allowed to hold or manage real estate except buildings for services or for the purpose of the institution (Lerdo Law).
- 30. Definition of Mexican nationality.
- 31. Obligations of Mexicans.
- 36. Obligations of citizens.
- 39. The sovereignty of the nation comes from the people.
- 40. Mexico is constituted as a representative, democratic, federal Republic, composed of free and sovereign States in everything concerning its internal regime.
- 50. Division of powers: executive, legislative, and judicial.
- 76. On the election of the president through indirect suffrage in the first degree and secret ballot.
- 77. Requirements to be elected president.
- 101 & 102. Amparo
- 123. Regulation of religion.
- 124. Prohibition on internal customs checkpoints.
- 128. Inviolability of the Constitution.

Despite problems in Texas, some deputies unsuccessfully proposed a law granting certain rights to foreign colonization by arguing that the country needed to be settled.

=== Articles 101 & 102 ===
In 1841, Mexican justice Manuel Crescencio Rejón (Spanish: Manuel Crescencio García Rejón) was instrumental in placing the inaugural Amparo in the constitution of the Republic of Yucatán (now the State of Yucatán), a procedure adopted to strengthen the judicial enforcement of individual rights in that state. In 1847, Rejón (from Yucatán) and Mariano Otero (considered the "second father of Amparo) were members of the six-member committee appointed to draft up the new 1857 Federal Constitution, that abrogated the Seven Laws ("Siete Leyes"). Borrowing the Yucatán's Constitution, Otero promoted an Amparo procedure, known as the Fórmula Otero, on the national level as part of the Act of Reforms ("Spanish: Acta de Reformas") (Article 25), which was almost universally approved. The "Otero Formula", a provision of the Act of Reforms which persists today, provided that the protection granted by an amparo judgment should contain no general declarations about the law or act complained of, thus having no effect beyond preventing the application of the constitutionally defective law to the immediate party complainant. The 1847 Reform Act officially incorporated and amended, the Federal Constitution of 1824 (which made no mention of amparo), to operate while the next constitution was drafted (1857 constitution). The 1857 constitution was Mexico's first "constitutionalization" of a writ of Amparo.

Amparo is the Spanish word for "protection" (literally also "favor", "aid", "defence", "shelter" or "help"). The generic legal concept of "amparo" is the annunciation of individual guarantees, and the judicial proceedings to protect those rights. Section 101 of the 1857 constitution established that the amparo will lie only against violations of individual rights. The conscious division of Amparo into two sections in the 1857 Mexican Constitution, as opposed to the United States Constitution, meant that, although it protects against violation of constitutional privileges, it may not issue an order to maintain respect for treaties and laws.

The 1857 Constitution provided that a special law relating to the procedure and regulation of an amparo suit should be enacted subsequently. This law of Amparo was divided into four sections: 1) violations of individual rights; 2) violations of state sovereignty; 3) violations of the Power of the Union; and 4) decisions and sentences. The first Amparo Law had little effect due to the French intervention, first by the war in which the nation was then engaged, and later by the establishment of the Empire under Maxmilian of Austria which suspended constitutional government. The Secretary of Justice drafted and presented a new law at the end of the year 1868, which was approved by Congress and promulgated on 20 January 1869. This law was more simple in its procedure, establishing a single suit to be judged in a summary proceeding by the district courts of the federal judiciary. This was likewise also superseded by an Amparo law in 1882., promulgated on 14 December 1882 and effective the following year. The use of the legislative writ of Apmaro increased significantly during the life span of the 1857 constitution, for example in 1869 only 123 suits were decided, in 1880, only a little more than a decade later, the number of cases had risen to 2,108, and in a three-month period from June 1901 to August 1901 there were 957 amparo suits heard and decided. In 1897, the first Federal Code of Civil Procedure was enacted, which included an Amparo suit, thus effectively repealing the 1882 law, followed by a similar Federal Code of Civil Procedure provision in 1908, which reflected the jurisprudence of the Supreme Court. The writ of Amparo legislation transformed Amparo from "an instrument lacking precise contours to a true proceeding directed at violative official acts, with a particular emphasis placed on the protection of life and liberty of the citizens."

The 1857 Constitution served as an important model for the subsequent current 1917 constitution, establishing a firm foundation for the amparo. The 1917 constitution largely tracks the 1857 constitution in order of article and text, only argumenting and clarifying certain clauses. Therefore, both of these amaro provisions featured in the subsequent 1917 Mexican constitution, i.e. article 101 (1857 version) was identical to article 103 (1917 version); and article 102 (1857 version) corresponded to article 107 (1917), with amendments Currently, amparo exists in 17 other countries, however, there is no comparable mechanism in the common law.

== Federation ==
During the promulgation of the constitution, the nation was composed of 23 states and one federal territory. Nuevo León merged with Coahuila with the latter name being adopted. The creation of a new state and the admission of three of the four territories as free states of the federation also occurred.

Map of Mexico under the Constitution of 1857

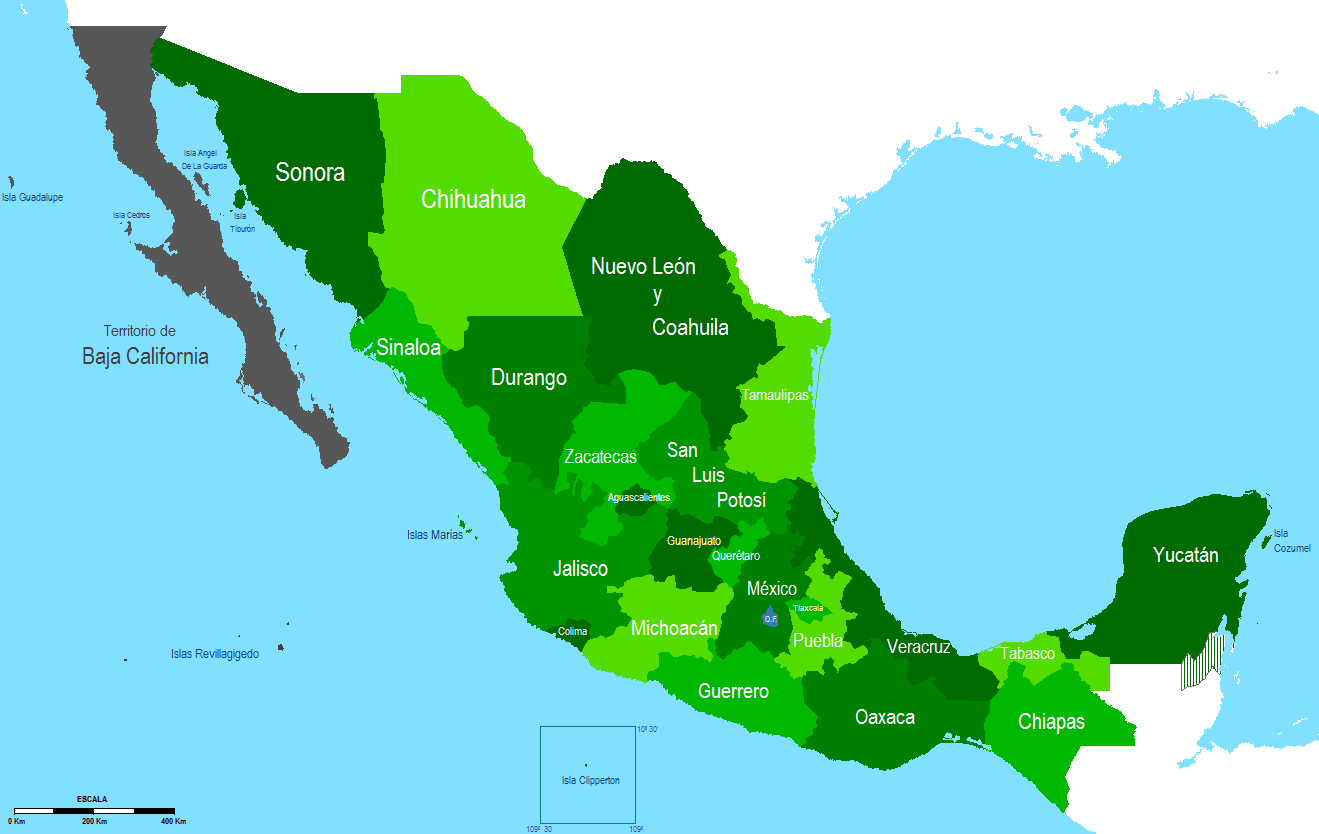

The 23 states of the federation were:
States admitted by the Constitution of 1824 were::

Order	Name	Order	Name
1	México	11	Querétaro
2	Guanajuato	12	Sonora
3	Oaxaca	13	Tabasco
4	Puebla	14	Tamaulipas
5	Michoacán	15	~~Nuevo León~~
6	San Luis Potosí	16	Coahuila y Texas
7	Veracruz	17	Durango
8	Yucatán	18	Chihuahua
9	Jalisco	19	Chiapas
10	Zacatecas	20	Sinaloa

New state created:

Order	Name	Date of Admission to the Federation	Installation date of the Congress
21	Guerrero	27-10-1849	30–01–1850

States admitted in 1857:

Order	Name	Date of Admission to the Federation	Installation date of the Congress
22	Tlaxcala	09-12-1856	01–06–1857
23	Colima	09-12-1856	19–07–1857
24	Aguascalientes	05-02-1857

The only federal territory was Baja California. Also, Mexico City was called the State of Valley of Mexico but only if the powers of the Federation moved to another site. On February 26, 1864, Nuevo León was separated from Coahuila and regained its status as a free state.

== Opposition ==
In December 1856, Pope Pius IX denounced the new Constitution and criticized the Juárez Law and the Lerdo Law: "All privileges of ecclesiastical jurisdiction are removed; it establishes that no one can absolutely enjoy emoluments that are a serious burden for society; everyone who can be bound by any obligation that implies either a contract, or a promise, or religious vows is prohibited; the free exercise of all cults is admitted, and everyone is granted the full power to manifest publicly and openly all kinds of opinions and thoughts." In March 1857, Archbishop José Lázaro de la Garza y Ballesteros stated that Catholics could not swear allegiance to the Constitution on pain of excommunication.

Justice Minister Ezequiel Montes met in the Holy See with the Cardinal Secretary of State. The Pope accepted the Juárez Law and the disposals of the Lerdo Law but demanded the ability to acquire political rights. The negotiations were interrupted by the resignation of President Comonfort.

In Mexico, the Congress presided over by Valentín Gómez Farías and the head of the Executive Comonfort swore the Constitution on 5 February 1857, which was promulgated on 11 March. Despite the fact that Comonfort won the elections, and that in December he should extend his mandate for a new presidential term, he considered that his popularity was seriously affected by the constitutional reforms in religious matters. In December he expressed his intention to reverse the reforms achieved by the Legislative branch.

Conservatives began planning a coup. A conservative general, Félix María Zuloaga, epudiated the Constitution. On 17 December 1857, he proclaimed the Plan of Tacubaya, which sought repeal of the Constitution and the convening of a new Constituent Congress. During the coup against the Congress and the Constitution, several ministers of Presidential Cabinet resigned. The president of the Supreme Court of Justice of the Nation, Benito Juárez, and the president of Congress, Isidoro Olvera, were taken prisoner.

On December 19, Mexican President Ignacio Comonfort adhered to the plan: "I just change my legal title of president, by those of revolutionary miserable." The states of México, Puebla, San Luis Potosí, Tlaxcala and Veracruz agreed the plan. Veracruz changed from supporting the conservatives to the liberals in a major blow against Comonfort. Zuloaga distrusted the president, because he thought that he was returning to the side of the Liberals. Without any alternative, Comonfort resorted to the pure and released Juárez and other political prisoners. On January 11, 1858, Comonfort resigned and left with a guard for Veracruz. On 7 February, he sailed for exile in the United States. As head of the Supreme Court, Juárez became president of Mexico on 21 January 1858.

== Immediate impact ==
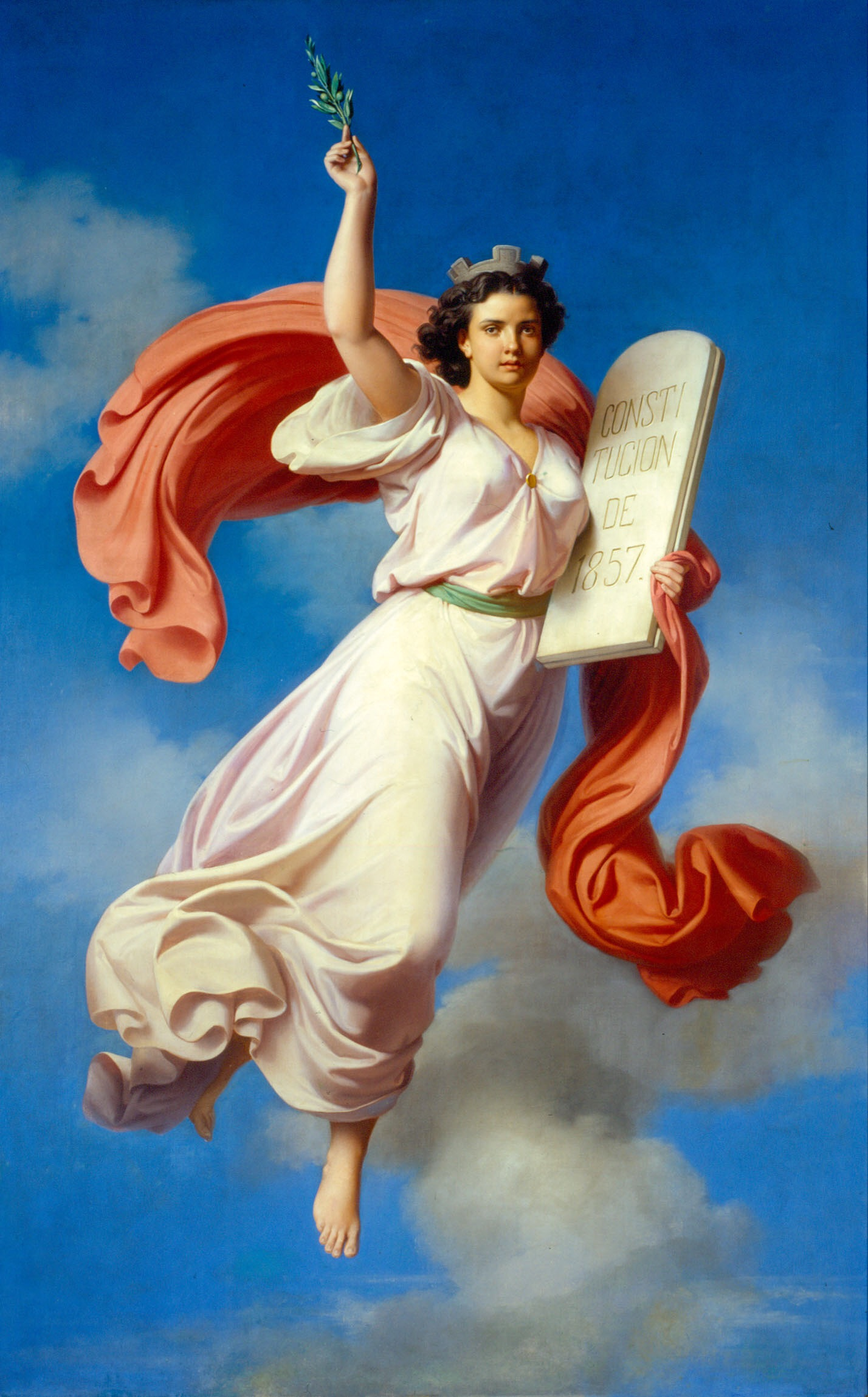
Alegoría de la Constitución de 1857, Petronilo Monroy, 1869.

Conservatives refused to recognize the new constitution or the liberal government. Conservative Félix Zuloaga established a Conservative Government in Mexico City; through the promulgation of Five Laws repealed the liberal reforms. Liberal were forced to move the seat of government to Guanajuato. Armies of the two opposing governments clashed in the Reform War.

States of Jalisco, Guanajuato, Querétaro, Michoacán, Nuevo León, Coahuila, Tamaulipas, Colima and Veracruz supported the liberal government of Benito Juárez and the Constitution of 1857. States of México, Puebla, San Luis Potosí, Chihuahua, Durango, Tabasco, Tlaxcala, Chiapas, Sonora, Sinaloa, Oaxaca and Yucatán supported the conservative government of Zuloaga.

After the Liberal government won the Reform War, President Juárez and his government added to the Constitution of 1857, the Reform Laws that had been enacted in Veracruz. Because of the civil war, the Constitution remained without effect on almost all the country until January, 1861, when the Liberals returned to the capital. In 1862, as a result of Franco-Mexican War and the establishment of Second Mexican Empire, the Constitution was suspended. In 1867 the liberal, republican forces succeeded in ousting the monarchy, and restored the Republic and bringing the constitution into effect.

== Replacement by the Constitution of 1917 ==
The winning faction of the Mexican Revolution, the Constitutionalists fought in the name of the Constitution of 1857, with the explicit understanding that they fought for constitutional order. During the Porfiriato, Díaz had strengthened the power of the executive and place his loyalists in power in most Mexican state governments, creating a centralized government. Díaz's critics viewed him as a dictator. On February 5, 1903, a liberal group protesting the regime placed on the balcony of the offices of the newspaper El hijo de El Ahuizote a great black banner for mourning with the legend "The Constitution is dead." Less well known is that Reform liberals, including Benito Juárez and Ignacio Comonfort saw the flaws of the 1857 constitution, which undercut the power of the executive. With the triumph of the Constitutionalists on the battlefield, there was a reassessment of the constitutional framework. Venustiano Carranza initially opposed calls for drafting an entirely new constitution in 1916, but advisers convinced him that doing that would be far easier than doing piecemeal amendments to the lengthy and complex charter for the nation.

== See also ==
- Liberal Reform
- Reform War
- Reform laws
- French intervention in Mexico
- Second Mexican Empire
- Constitutions of Mexico
- Federal Constitution of the United Mexican States of 1824
- Political Constitution of the United Mexican States of 1917 (currently in force)
- Politics of Mexico
- History of democracy in Mexico

== Notes ==
- ^aThe fueros were privileges that kept the military and clergy to forbade members of these two groups were judged by the law, which effectively put them above the law and that no matter what kind of crime they committed, could not be judged, or in the best cases judged by special courts.
