= President of the Council of Ministers of the Mexican Empire =

First Minister of the Mexican Empire
- Status: Head of cabinet
- Residence: Mexico City, Mexican Empire
- Seat: Chapultepec Castle
- Appointer: Emperor of Mexico (1864–1867)
- Term length: No term length
- Formation: June 13, 1864
- First holder: José María Lacunza
- Final holder: Santiago Vidaurri
- Abolished: March 19, 1823; June 19, 1867

President of the Council of Ministers of the Mexican Empire, First Minister, or Chancellor was an institutional figure that existed in the Second Mexican Empire since 1864 to 1867 by Maximilian of Habsburg.

== Appointment ==
The president of the Council of Ministers was appointed by the emperor and had to be ratified by Congress in the case of the Second Mexican Empire. The president of the Council holds the presidency of the Council although he may also be the holder of a Ministry of State, mainly the Ministry of Foreign Affairs. The other ministers were appointed by the emperor directly. For the validity of the norms and decrees issued by the emperor, the signatures of the prime minister and of the ministers of the portfolios related to the matter of such are necessary; Government acts that lack ministerial endorsement in a constitutional system are null.

== Former holders of the title ==
Parties

Conservative Party
Liberal Party

=== First Empire ===
#	Name	Portrait	Monarch	Took office	Left office	Party
1	José Manuel de Herrera		Agustin I	May 19, 1822	March 19, 1823	Liberal Party

=== Second Empire ===
#	Name	Portrait	Monarch	Took office	Left office	Party
2	José María Lacunza		Maximilian I	June 13, 1864	October 6, 1866	Liberal Party
3	Teodosio Lares		Maximilian I	October 7, 1866	March 18, 1867	Conservative Party
4	Santiago Vidaurri		Maximilian I	March 19, 1867	June 19, 1867	Liberal Party
