= José María Lacunza =

Mexican novelist and politician

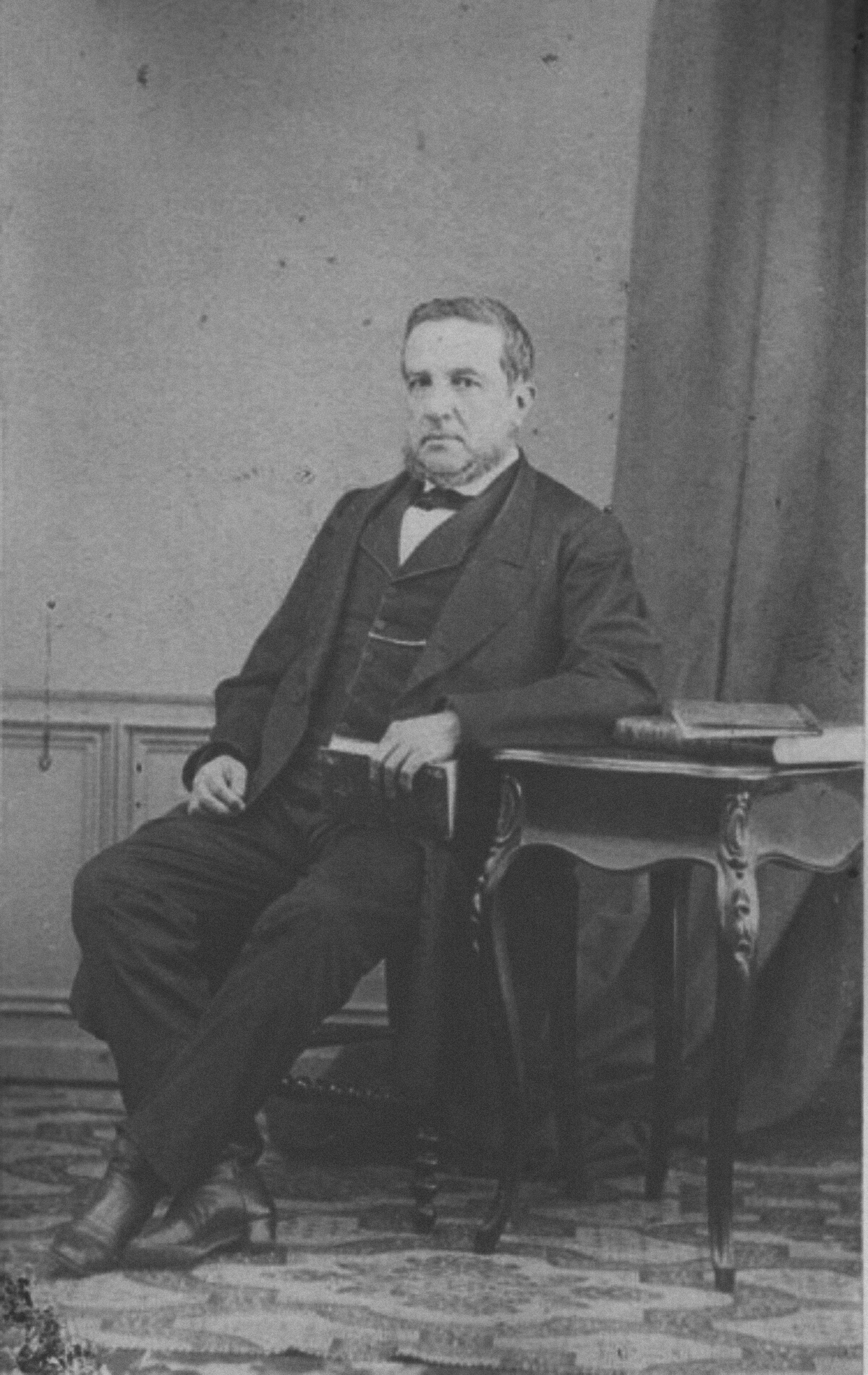

2nd First Minister of Mexico
- In office 13 June 1864 – 6 October 1866
- Monarch: Maximilian I
- Preceded by: (José Manuel de Herrera as First Minister during First Mexican Empire)
- Succeeded by: Teodosio Lares

Minister of Interior and Exterior Relations
- In office 10 May 1849 – 5 January 1851
- President: José Joaquín de Herrera
- Preceded by: José María Ortiz
- Succeeded by: José Mariano Yáñez

Personal details
- Born: 18 August 1809 Mexico City, New Spain
- Died: 2 January 1869 (aged 59) La Habana, Captaincy General of Cuba
- Party: Liberal-Moderate

José María Lacunza Blengio (18 August 1809 – 2 January 1869) was a Mexican politician and diplomat. In 1836, with his brother Juan Nepomuceno Lacunza, he founded the Academia de Letrán, where he published his Historical Discourses. As a columnist he wrote for El Mosaico Mexicano, El Siglo Diez y Nueve and El Monitor Republicano.

He was the President of the Chamber of Deputies in 1848. From 10 May 1849 to 15 January 1851, he held the position of Minister of Relations during the government of José Joaquín de Herrera. During his tenure, he was in charge of handling the debt with the Spanish creditors. Additionally, he worked on the Treaty of Guadalupe-Hidalgo, rejecting the free passage through the Isthmus of Tehuantepec, which the United States government claimed, could maintain the negative in favor of national sovereignty. He was president of the Senate and was in charge of the Directorate General of Funds and Public Instruction, being Minister of Finance during the presidential term of Benito Juárez.

During the Second Mexican Empire he was Minister of State of Maximilian I of Mexico and promoter of cultural policy. After the empire was defeated, Lacunza was banished to La Habana where he died in 1869.
