= Teodosio Lares =

Mexican philosopher

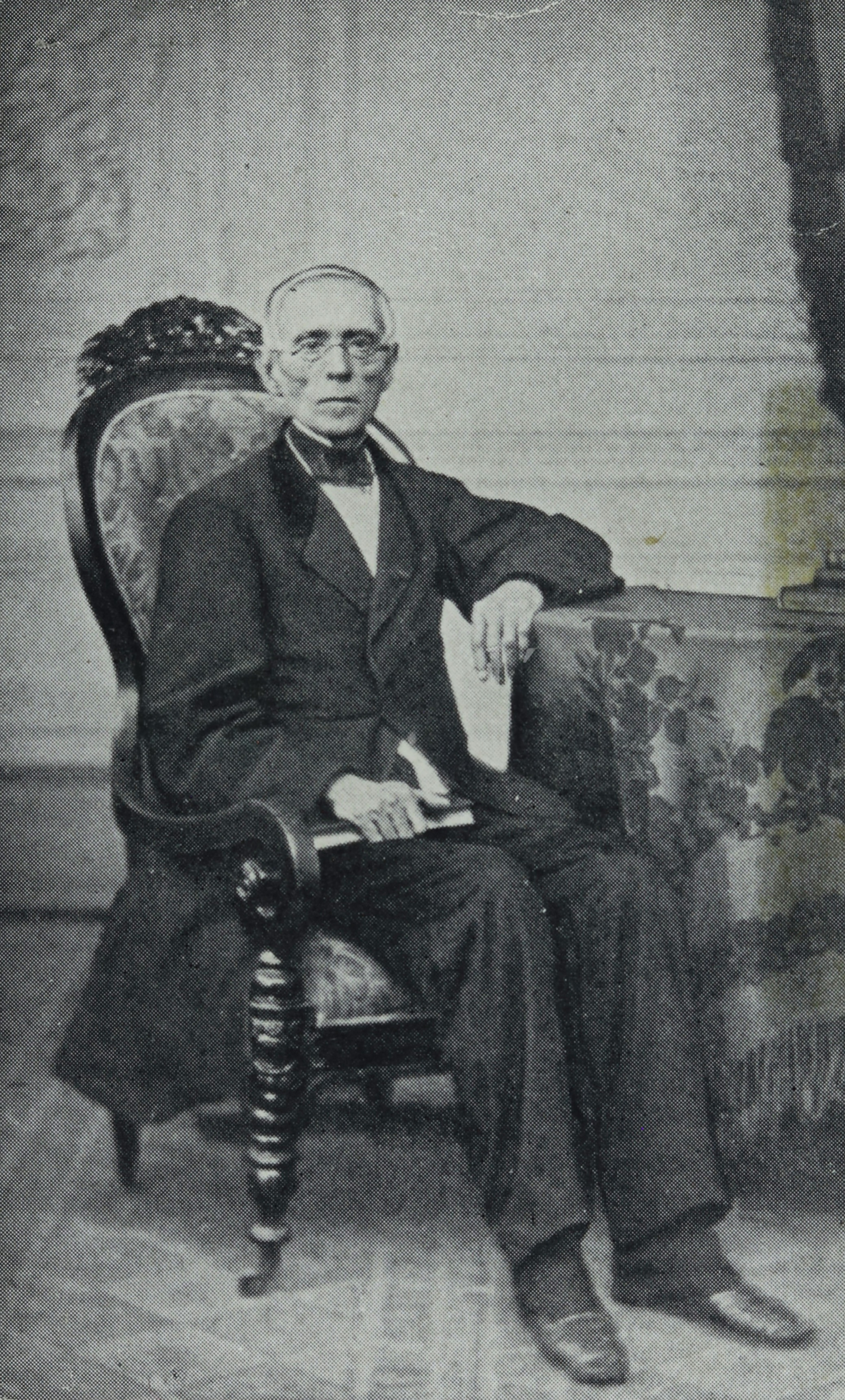
- Teodosio Lares

3rd First Minister of Mexico
- In office October 6, 1866 – March 18, 1867
- Monarch: Maximilian I
- Preceded by: José María Lacunza
- Succeeded by: Santiago Vidaurri

Personal details
- Born: May 26, 1806 Aguascalientes, Mexico
- Died: 22 January 1870 (aged 63) Mexico City, Mexico
- Party: Conservative

Teodosio Lares (26 May 1806 – 22 January 1870) was a Mexican lawyer and politician. He studied Philosophy and Jurisprudence in the Seminary of Guadalajara. In 1827 he began his career as a lawyer in the Supreme Court of the State of Jalisco. He returned to Zacatecas, where he was magistrate of the Supreme Court of Justice. In 1836 he was director of the Literary Institute of Zacatecas. In 1848 he was deputy to the General Congress for the state of Zacatecas. In 1850 he was appointed senator of the Tercio by the Chamber of Deputies.

From 1858 to 1860, during the War of Reform, he was Minister of Justice in the presidencies of Félix María Zuloaga and Miguel Miramón. In 1863, during the French intervention, he was Minister of the Supreme Court of Justice of the Regency.

From 1866 to 1867, during the rule of Maximilian of Habsburg, he was president of the Supreme Court of Justice, and president of the Council of Ministers of the Empire. He was decorated as Commander of the Imperial Order of the Mexican Eagle and with the First Class Medal for Civil Merit.
