= Santiago Vidaurri =

Mexican army general and politician

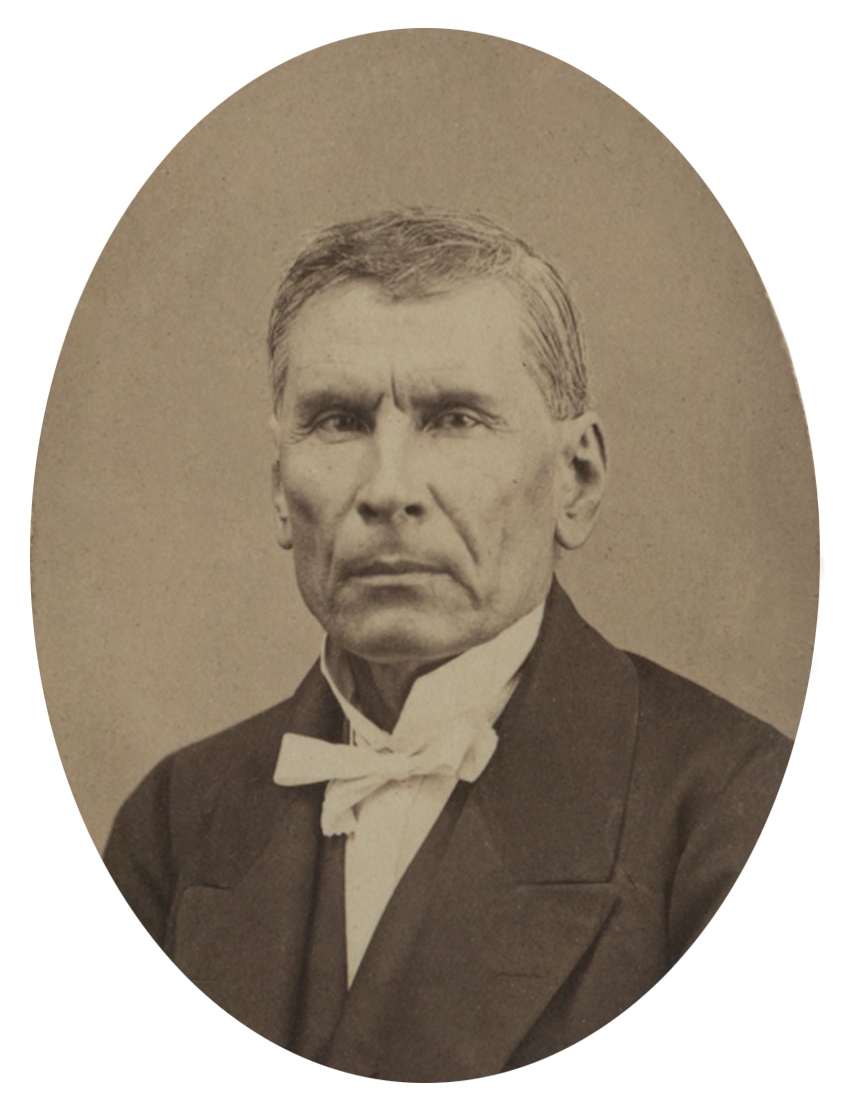

4th First Minister of Mexico
- In office March 19, 1867 – June 19, 1867
- Monarch: Maximilian I
- Preceded by: Teodosio Lares
- Succeeded by: Post abolished

Governor of Nuevo León and Coahuila
- In office 17 August 1857 – 25 September 1859
- Preceded by: Juan Nepomuceno de la Garza y Evia (Nuevo León); Santiago Rodríguez del Bosque (Coahuila)
- Succeeded by: José Silvestre Aramberri

Governor of Nuevo León
- In office 23 May 1855 – 12 December 1856
- Preceded by: Jerónimo Cardona
- Succeeded by: Jerónimo Cardona

Personal details
- Born: July 24, 1809 Villa Punta de Lampazos, New Kingdom of León, Viceroyalty of New Spain (now Nuevo León, Mexico)
- Died: July 8, 1867 (aged 57) Mexico City, Mexico
- Party: Liberal

José Santiago Vidaurri Valdez (July 24, 1809 – July 8, 1867) was a controversial and powerful governor of the northern Mexican states of Nuevo León and Coahuila between 1855 and 1864. He was an advocate of federalism.

In 1855, he supported the liberal Revolution of Ayutla, which overthrew the dictatorship of Antonio López de Santa Anna, the military strongman who dominated Mexican politics in the 1830s until his overthrow in 1855. Vidaurri stood by the liberal president Benito Juárez during the subsequent War of the Reform, a bloody civil war following Mexican conservatives' repudiation of the liberal government and the Constitution of 1857. During the war, Vidaurri commanded the liberal armies of the north. During the American Civil War (1861–65), Southern slave states had seceded from the United States and formed the Confederate States of America (CSA). Vidaurri sought advantageous trade relationships with the CSA, which bordered northern Mexico.

Confederate forces had early successes in 1861–62 against the northern Union troops, so that it was entirely possible that its existence as a sovereign nation would continue. It was a pragmatic move for Vidaurri and northern Mexico to establish such a connection. Although Mexican conservatives had been defeated militarily in the Reform War, they still sought a way to power so that when Juárez cancelled payment on foreign bonds in 1861 there was an opening for Mexican monarchists.

A coalition of European powers sought intervention for debt collection, with France using the opportunity for regime change in Mexico, with the support of Mexican conservatives. The French invaded, displacing Juárez from the capital Mexico City. Although Mexican conservatives had invited Habsburg Archduke Maximilian to be emperor of Mexico, put into power by the French, Maximilian was in fact a political liberal.

Vidaurri broke with Juárez, who never went into foreign exile, but whose government did not effectively control territory. Vidaurri was one of several moderate liberals who joined the cabinet of Emperor Maximilian of Mexico in the Second Mexican Empire and served in early 1867 as the emperor's final First Minister. When the Empire fell in 1867, Vidaurri was captured and summarily executed by the restored Republican government. His place in Mexican history remains clouded by his collaboration with the Empire, but in Nuevo León he remains an important historical figure.

== Early life ==
Vidaurri was born in Villa Punta de Lampazos, New Kingdom of León on July 24, 1809, the oldest of the four sons of Pedro José Vidaurri de la Cruz and María Teodora Valdez Solís. A rumor circulated that "he was the son of an unknown Indian brave, raised to adulthood by roaming bands of indios bárbaros, but his baptismal record shows that he was born in Lampazos in 1809.

== Political career ==
Regions of Mexico (by cardinal direction), Northeast Mexico in orange

Vidaurri is best known as the strongman of northeast Mexico during the 1850s and 1860s who defended that territory against outside intervention. The first notice of him appears when he cut off a soldier's hand in 1832, with unknown adverse consequences to him, but he went on to become a clerk for the police of Nuevo León and then, in 1837, an assistant to the governor of the state, Joaquín García, and then Manuel María de Llano. Vidaurri then became his secretary and was chosen by General Arista to spy on the Texan Santa Fe Expedition, sponsored by Texas President Mirabeau B. Lamar. The purpose was to divert the Santa Fe Trail into Texas and establish control over New Mexico. In the 1840s and early 1850s, Vidaurri worked with Mexican conservatives, but broke with them and joined the liberal revolt against Antonio López de Santa Anna. Santa Anna attempted to strengthen central government rule over Mexican states, which had held considerable autonomy. Vidaurri promulgated a plan called "Restaurador de la Libertad" (restorer of liberty), captured the main city of Nuevo León, Monterrey, in May 1855, and became both military commander in the state.

In the southern state of Guerrero, strongman Juan Álvarez organized resistance to Santa Anna and a political plan to oust him. The Plan of Ayutla resulted in uprisings in southern Mexico and were then joined by many in northern Mexico. The revolution of Ayutla then gained the necessary speed it needed when it was joined by Santos Degollado and Manuel Doblado. Vidaurri supported the Revolution of Ayutla and had already seized the opportunity to create his own area of political control in northern Mexico. The northern supporters of the Revolution of Ayutla were important to its success; without such support it might well have been a southern regional rebellion penned in and suffering a war of attrition. In this period Vidaurri's reputation as a liberal was solidified. "Vidaurri had become one of the champions of Mexican liberalism during the first years of his cacicazgo [political area of control] over the northeast, especially its most radical faction, the puros.

Historian Brian Hamnett argues that, following Mexican independence, the support for federalism for which many Liberals advocated was a kind of institutionalized centrifugalism. Santa Anna's attempts to centralize power met resistance from areas that had exercised a level of autonomy, such as Guerrero under Álvarez and northeast Mexico under Vidaurri. Vidaurri had overthrown the governor of Nuevo León and annexed Coahuila, eliminating any opposition. The forced merger of Coahuila and Nuevo León in April 1856 was opposed by President Ignacio Comonfort, with Vidaurri appealing to the federal congress for support. The central government was too weak to counter his defiance, and it acquiesced to the situation out of necessity. With the ratification of the liberal Constitution of 1857, which had federalist principles of a weak central state and strong states' rights, Vidaurri, as leader of Coahuila-Nuevo León, was de facto head of a sovereign nation. He had an army, collected customs revenues, and was free of central government interference. He was powerful and potentially dangerous, given the size and location of the territory he controlled in northern Mexico. In Nuevo León-Coahuila, he had dealings with one of the elite families of the region, the Sánchez Navarros, the largest landowners in Mexico. At various points, Vidaurri attempted to force the family to sell him an hacienda, shook them down for a 10,000 pesos "contribution" to shore up the Vidaurri administration when it was short of funds, and sacked a family mansion in Saltillo.

=== War of the Reform ===
During the War of the Reform (1858–1860), Vidaurri supported the Mexican Republic headed by Benito Juárez, but, during the French intervention in Mexico, he supported the French. Vidaurri raised an army in his merged states of Coahuila and Nuevo León. In September 1858, Vidaurri's forces were defeated by conservative general Miguel Miramón. One way Liberals sought to finance the civil war against the Conservatives was the sale or confiscation of property held by the Catholic Church. Vidaurri did not wait for formal sanctioning of this policy, but implemented it in his territory, as did Jesús González Ortega. A major source of revenue for Vidaurri were those that were collected by the customs houses along the U.S.–Mexico border, which he kept rather than turning them over to the federal Liberals. For that, Benito Juárez denounced him, and some of Vidaurri's allies deserted him to follow Juárez. Evaristo Madero, grandfather of Francisco I. Madero, who challenged Porfirio Díaz for the presidency in 1910, was a successful businessman in Northeast Mexico, and was for a time an ally of Vidaurri; The elder Madero broke with Vidaurri and supported Juárez. Later the Madero family married into the Milmo Vidaurri Family.

=== Second Mexican Empire ===
With the secession of Southern states from the United States and the formation of the Confederate States of America, Vidaurri established relationships with the nascent Confederate government. Vidaurri met with Confederate agent Juan A. Quintero in June 1861. Vidaurri believed that relations with the Confederacy could prove profitable for his territory and insure border peace, and he made his overture to Confederate President Jefferson Davis.

During the Second French Intervention in Mexico and the establishment of the Second Mexican Empire, Vidaurri broke with Juárez, as early as March 1864, over the administration and finances of his state, and even held a referendum on joining the Empire. Republican troops drove him into Texas, but troops loyal to Vidaurri remained active in the region. As Republican forces in the north were diverted by Imperial advances. Vidaurrist troops captured Monterrey on 15 August 1864, with President Juárez barely escaping, and pursued as far as Parras in a bullet-riddled carriage. The triumphant Vidaurri then headed towards the capital where he was made a councilor of Emperor Maximilian. By the end of the year, the imperialists controlled Nuevo León and the greater part of Coahuila to the banks of the Rio Grande, the border with the Confederate States of America.

== Death ==
The Empire collapsed in 1867 and Emperor Maximilian was captured by Republican forces. Vidaurri was arrested by a squadron "and executed without a trial as a traitor to the Mexican nation."

== Legacy ==
Although Vidaurri is often written out of the historiography of Mexico or disparaged for his support of the Second Mexican Empire, he remains an important historical figure in his home state of Nuevo León. A 2007 attempt to erect a statue of Vidaurri in Lampazos, where he was born, was embroiled in controversy.

On April 23, 1857, his daughter, Prudenciana Vidaurri, married prominent Irish businessman Patrick Milmo O'Dowd, who profited from the cotton trade with the Confederate States of America. The family continued to play an important role in late nineteenth-century Monterrey. The union produced a son, Patricio Milmo Vidaurri, who would marry Patricia Hickman Morales. Patricio and Patricia became the parents of Laura Milmo Hickman, wife of Emilio Azcárraga Vidaurreta, pioneer of Mexican television and one of the founders of Televisa. Emilio and Laura were the parents of Mexican entrepreneur Emilio Azcárraga Milmo, father in turn of the current chairman of the boards of Televisa and Club América, Emilio Azcárraga Jean.

== Bibliography ==
- LosVidaurri.com (Vidaurri Family portal)
- Guillermo Prieto – Lecciones de historia Patria
