= Cabinet of Maximilian I of Mexico =

- Empire
- Seal of the Second Mexican Empire
- Formation: 10 April 1864
- Extinction: 15 May 1867

Executive branch
- Emperor: Head of government Head of state

The Cabinet of Maximilian I of Mexico was formed by the holders of the Ministries of State of Mexico appointed by Emperor Maximilian I during the Second Mexican Empire, from 10 April 1864 to 15 May 1867.

== Cabinet ==
Ministry	Name	Party	Term
Ministry of State	Joaquín Velázquez de León; José Fernando Ramírez; José D. Ulibarri	PC; PC; PC	10 April 1864– 6 January 1866; 8 January 1866– 8 March 1866; 8 March 1866– 15 June 1866
Ministry of the Imperial House	Juan N. Almonte; Martín del Castillo y Cos; Luis Arroyo; Carlos Sánchez Navarro	PC; PC; PC; PC	10 April 1865– 8 March 1866; 8 March 1866– 24 September 1866; 24 September 1866– 16 January 1867; 16 January 1867– 15 May 1867
Foreign Affairs	José Miguel Arroyo; José Fernando Ramírez; Martín del Castillo; Luis Arroyo; Juan Nepomuceno Pereda; Tomás Murphy	PC; PC; PC; PC; PC	13 June 1864– 3 July 1864; 3 July 1864– 18 October 1865; 18 October 1865– 8 July 1866; 8 July 1866– 25 September 1866; 25 September 1866– 16 January 1867; 16 January 1867– 15 May 1867
Interior	José María González de la Vega; José María Cortés y Esparza; Manuel Siliceo; José María Esteva; José Salazar Ilarregui; Teófilo Marín; José María Iribarren	PC; PL; PC; PC; PC; PC; PC	13 June 1864– 20 November 1864; 20 November 1864– 25 May 1865; 25 May 1865– 7 June 1865; 7 June 1865– 3 March 1866; 3 March 1866– 14 September 1866; 14 September 1866– 19 March 1867; 19 March 1867– 15 May 1867
Justice and Ecclesiastical Affairs	Felipe Raygosa; José Fernando Ramírez; Pedro Escudero Echánove	PC; PC; PL	13 June 1864– 4 July 1864; 4 July 1864– 17 November 1864; 17 November 1864– 10 April 1865
Justice	Pedro Escudero Echánove; Eduardo Torres Torrija; Teodosio Lares; Manuel García Aguirre; Pedro Sánchez Castro	PL; PC; PC; PC; PC	10 April 1865– 29 May 1866; 29 May 1866– 16 July 1866; 16 July 1866– 18 March 1867; 19 March 1867– 3 April 1867; 3 April 1867– 15 May 1867
Public Instruction and Cults	Manuel Siliceo; Francisco Artigas; Pedro Escudero Echánove; Mariano A. Bejarano; Manuel García Aguirre	PC; PC; PL; PC; PC	10 April 1865– 18 October 1865; 18 October 1865– 3 March 1866; 3 March 1866– 29 May 1866; 29 May 1866– 14 September 1866; 14 September 1866– 15 May 1867
Promotion	José Salazar Ilarregui; José María Ruiz; Luis Robles Pezuela; Francisco Somera; José Salazar Ilarregui; Joaquín de Mier y Terán; José María Iribarren	PC; PC; PC; PC; PC; PC; PC	13 June 1864– 21 August 1864; 21 August 1864– 18 October 1864; 18 October 1864– 3 March 1866; 3 March 1866– 26 July 1866; 26 July 1866– 14 September 1866; 14 September 1866– 19 March 1867; 19 March 1867– 15 May 1867
War	Juan de Dios Peza; José M. García; A. D'Osmont; Carlos Blanchot; Tomás Murphy; Nicolás de la Portilla	PC; PC; PC; PC; PC; PC	13 June 1864– 3 March 1866; 3 March 1866– 26 July 1866; 26 July 1866– 20 September 1866; 20 September 1866– 14 December 1866; 14 December 1866– 11 February 1867; 11 February 1867– 15 May 1867
Treasury	Martín del Castillo y Cos; Félix Campillo; Francisco Paula César; Martín del Castillo y Cos; José María Lacunza; M. Friant; Joaquín Torres Larraínzar; José Mariano Campos; Santiago Vidaurri; Esteban Villalba	PC; PC; PC; PC; PC; PC; PC; PC; PC; PC	13 June 1864– 18 March 1865; 18 March 1865– 10 August 1865; 10 August 1865– 3 March 1866; 3 March 1866– 11 May 1866; 11 May 1866– 26 July 1866; 26 July 1866– 24 September 1866; 24 September 1866– 9 October 1866; 9 October 1866– 19 March 1867; 19 March 1867– 1 May 1867; 1 May 1867– 15 May 1867
Presidents of the Council of Ministers	José María Lacunza; Teodosio Lares; Santiago Vidaurri	PC; PC; PC	13 June 1864– 6 October 1866; 6 October 1866– 19 March 1867; 19 March 1867– 15 May 1867

== See also ==
- Maximilian I of Mexico
- Second Mexican Empire
- Cabinet
