= Imperial Mexican Academy of Science and Literature =

Mexican Imperial academy

Imperial Academy of Science and Literature Academia Imperial de Ciencias y Literatura
- Formation: 1865
- Founder: Emperor Maximilian
- Founded at: Mexico City
- President: José Fernando Ramírez

The Imperial Academy of Science and Literature (Academia Imperial de Ciencias y Literatura) was founded by Emperor Maximilian under the Second Mexican Empire by a decree published on April 10, 1865, with the aim of promoting and protecting the activities of professional academics. It was to be composed of three departments: science and mathematics, philosophy and history, and philology and literature.

José Fernando Ramírez was named president and named to the philosophy and history department. To the science and mathematics department was named Leopoldo Río de la Loza, Miguel F. Jiménez, head of the school of medicine, Joaquin de Mier y Teran professor of mathematics at the College of Mining, and Antonio del Castillo. To the philosophy and history department were named the lawyers Pascual Almazan, Joaquin Garcia Icazbalceta, and the lawyer Manuel Orozco y Berra. To the philology and literature department were named Luis Gonzaga Cuevas, Jose Maria Barcena, Francisco Pimentel and José María Lacunza.

The academy was inaugurated on July 6 in the grand ballroom of Chapultepec Castle in the presence of both the Emperor and the Empress. Maximilian gave a speech highlighting government efforts to improve the technology of the nation including in the fields of agriculture, transportation, communications, and mining. This was followed by a speech by Fernando Ramirez touching upon the same themes.

As the political situation of the Empire became precarious, the academy ceased operations in 1866.
