= Shawcross =

Shawcross /ˈʃɔːkrɒs/ is an English surname. Notable people with this surname include the following:

- Arthur Shawcross (1945–2008), American serial killer
- Christopher Nyholm Shawcross (1905–1973), English lawyer and politician; brother of Hartley Shawcross
- Conrad Shawcross (born 1977), English artist; son of William Shawcross
- David Shawcross (1941–2015), English footballer
- Debbie Shawcross, British physician and academic
- Edward Shawcross, British historian
- Hartley Shawcross, Baron Shawcross (1902–2003), English lawyer and politician
- Howard Shawcross, Australian musician
- Kerry Shawcross (born 1991), American writer and director
- Kevin Shawcross (1948–1987), Australian squash player
- Neil Shawcross (born 1940), English artist
- Ryan Shawcross (born 1987), English footballer
- Val Shawcross, English Labour Party politician
- William Shawcross (born 1946), English writer, journalist and commentator, and charity administrator; son of Hartley Shawcross
