= 1863 Mexican emperor referendum =

- November 18, 1863

Results
Choice	Votes	%
Yes	6,445,564	100.00%
No	0	0.00%
Valid votes	6,445,564	100.00%
Invalid or blank votes	0	0.00%
Total votes	6,445,564	100.00%
Registered voters/turnout		74.77%

A referendum on Maximilian becoming Emperor was held in Mexico on 4 December 1863. The proposal was supposedly approved by 100% of voters, with not a single vote cast against. Maximilian subsequently took the throne on 11 April 1864, starting the era of the Second Mexican Empire.

== Background ==
In 1861 Mexican president Benito Juárez declared a moratorium on the country's debt as it was effectively bankrupt. The country's creditors, Spain, France, and Great Britain decided to take action and formalized plans to militarily intervene in Mexico at the Convention of London on October 31, 1861. The port of Veracruz was occupied, but Spain and Great Britain began to back away as they realized France intended to overthrow the Mexican government in a plot that gained collaboration from Mexican monarchists.

On 10 June 1863, French troops, commanded by General Élie Frédéric Forey, captured Mexico City. Forey organized a new Mexican government which resolved to establish a Mexican monarchy and invite Maximilian to assume the Imperial Crown. He agreed but put forth the condition that the Empire had to be ratified by a national plebiscite. Napoleon III subsequently passed orders down to Marshal Bazaine to arrange such a referendum.

== Conduct ==
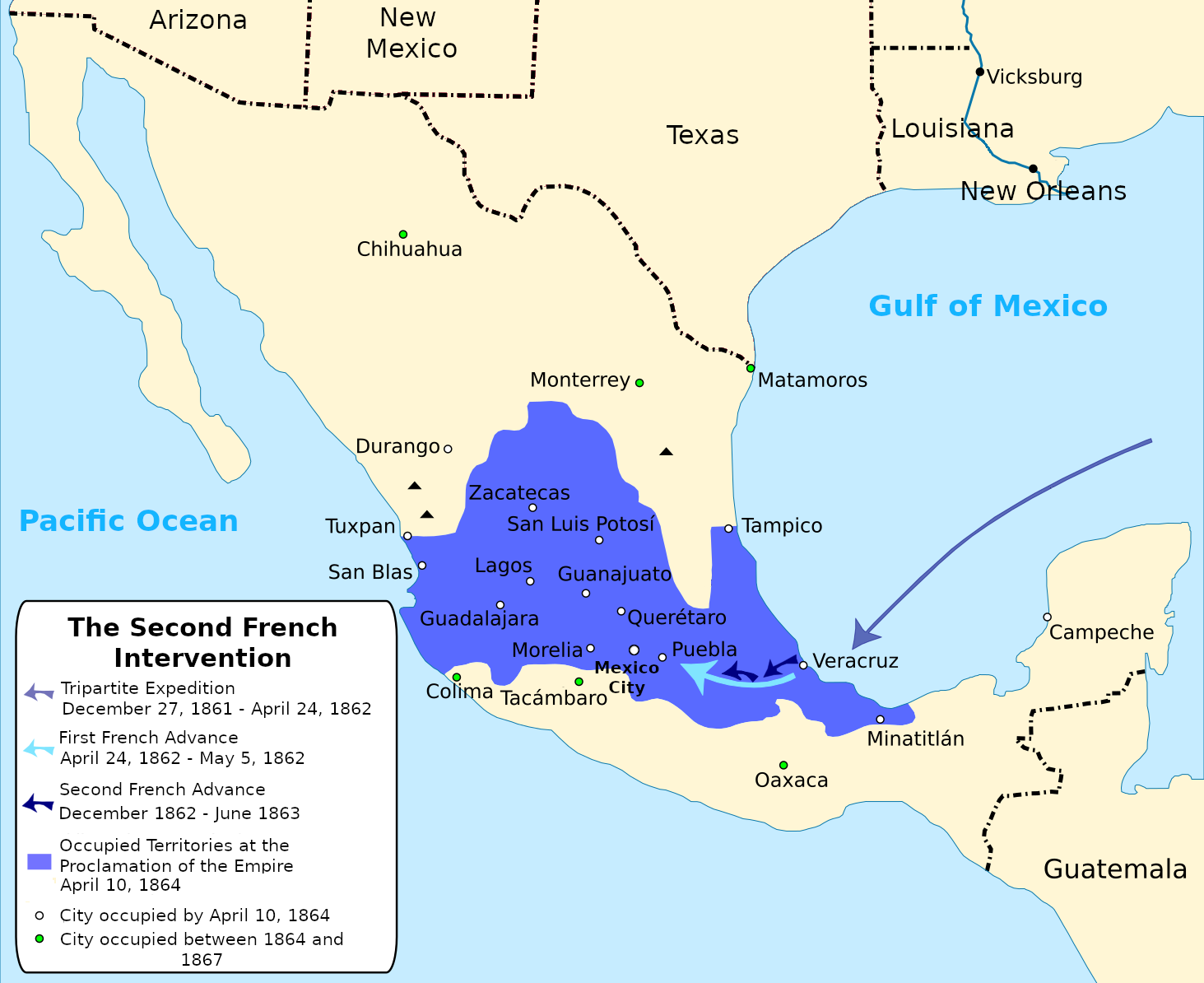
Map of French occupied territories

The referendum has been characterized as fraudulent. The invading French army only conducted the referendum in the occupied areas between Mexico City and Veracruz. When the leading citizens of Potosí refused to sign acts of adhesion, the French had them imprisoned for thirty six hours until they yielded.

The results were also manipulated by taking referendum returns from certain areas in a region and adding the total number of the region's population to the votes. Voters signed a register (which ultimately weighed 700 lbs) that was subsequently passed to Maximilian in Trieste. Mexican historian José María Vigil wrote that Maximilian's acceptance of the results amounted to "a true excess in credulity."

== Results ==
The official figures are not deemed credible. Jankoff further disputed the unanimous figure and suggested that only 18 of the 24 states returned affirmative results, with around 7,303,000 votes for a monarchy led by Maximilian and around 1,162,000 against.

Choice	Votes	%
For	6,445,564	100.00
Against	0	0.00
Total	6,445,564	100.00
Total votes	6,445,564	–
Registered voters/turnout	8,620,982	74.77
Source: Direct Democracy
