= Villa Carlota, Mexico =

Villa Carlota is the name under which two German farming settlements, in the villages of Santa Elena and Pustunich in Yucatán, were founded during the Second Mexican Empire (1864–1867). This colonization program is not to be confused with the Carlota Colony, an American settlement in Veracruz.

For strategically and political reasons, Emperor Maximilian I of Mexico's immigration policy included the goal to colonize the Yucatán Peninsula with approximately 600 European families of farmers and artisans per year. The leader of this colonization program was the Imperial Commissioner to Yucatán, José Salazar Ilarregui. At an operation level, the director was the German engineer and cartographer Moritz von Hippel.

Being a pilot program, Villa Carlota attracted 443 German-speaking immigrants, most of them simple farmers and artisans. The majority came as families. The first group, formed by 224 settlers, arrived to the port of Sisal, Yucatán, on October 25, 1865. These families settled in Santa Elena, a village with mostly Maya people, around 100 kilometers south of Mérida, the capital of Yucatán. Another 219 colonizers arrived to that same port on July 15, 1866; most of them were sent to the tiny village of Pustunich, some to Santa Elena and a few others stayed in Mérida or went to work to other Yucatecan locations, such as Holbox, Laguna de Términos or Baca. 72% of the colonists came from Prussia and many of them were Protestants.

Although in general these immigrants were well received by the hosting society, and the Imperial government apparently honored to the extent of its capabilities the contract it offered to these farmers, the colonies collapsed in 1867. Passive – and perhaps active- opposition from the Yucatecan elite to the project, the inappropriateness of the cultivation tracts for the purpose assigned to the settlement, organizational problems amongst the colonists themselves and the fall of the Second Empire were some of the most important factors leading to the collapse of the program.

Relatively soon after having settled in Santa Elena, the settler's families started to create relationships with the locals. Marriages between Germans and people of Santa Elena took place; a considerable number of the Germans who were originally Protestants converted into Catholicism; many of the padrinos were Yucatecans. This explains partly why until our days the oral tradition around this historical event is still so rich.

After the disintegration of Villa Carlota as such, some families migrated to other parts of the peninsula, into the United States and back to Germany. Many stayed, however, in Yucatán, where there are descendants of these pioneers with last names such as Worbis, Dietrich and Sols, among others.

The following characteristics are special about Villa Carlota: (1) It was probably the first case of subsidized migration into México. (2) Being a working migration, and not an "elite" one, the Villacarlotans constitute an "exceptional case among the Germans who migrated into Mexico". (3) Contrary to the settlement patterns found in other Latin-American countries, the Villa Carlotans settled within existing Maya communities: this provided many opportunities for intercultural contact, miscegenation and acculturation. (4) The results brought about by the analysis of Villa Carlota correct "a long list of inaccurate preconceptions about the migration politics of the Second Empire", as well as the idea that only "elite" German migration was received by Mexico.

In 2008 the Archivo Histórico de Mérida Yucatán hosted a large exhibit about this subject, entitled " Villa Carlota: Una reconstrucción documental de la historia de las colonias alemanas en Yucatán".

Family histories by descendants

Some descendants of these pioneers have already started to research on their own and to publish accounts of their family's histories.
