= Second Mexican Empire =

1863–1867 French-backed Mexican conservative monarchy in Mexico

Mexican Empire Imperio Mexicano (Spanish)
- 1863–1867
- Flag Imperial coat of arms
- Motto: Equidad en la Justicia "Equity in Justice"
- Anthem: Himno Nacional Mexicano (English: "National Anthem of Mexico")
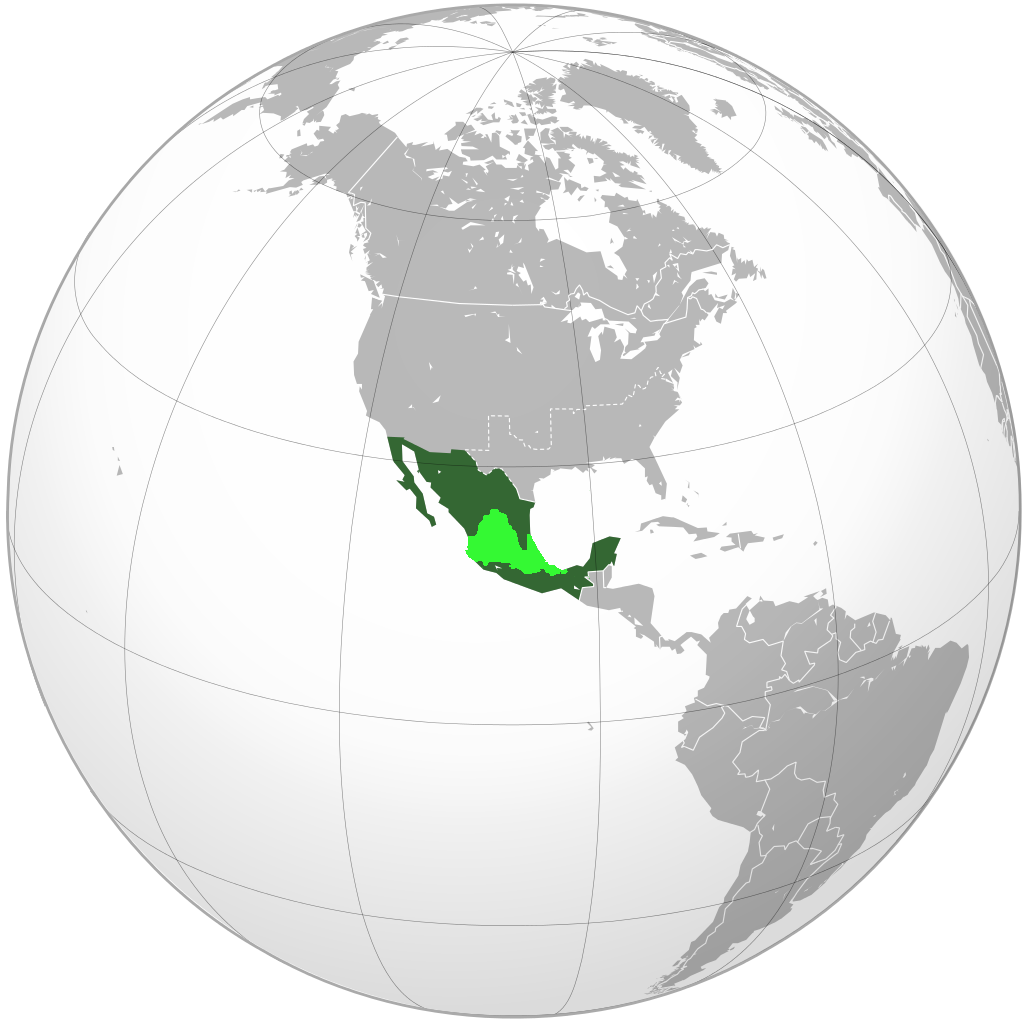
- Territory administered (light green) and territory claimed (dark green) by the Second Mexican Empire in April 1864, when Maximilian accepted the throne.
- Status: Independent monarchy, client state of France
- Capital: Mexico City
- Common languages: Spanish
- Government: Federal parliamentary constitutional monarchy
- Emperor
  - 1864–1867: Maximilian I
- Regency
  - 1863–1864: Juan Almonte, José Salas, Pelagio de Labastida
- Prime Minister
  - 1864–1866: José María Lacunza
  - 1866–1867: Teodosio Lares
  - 1867: Santiago Vidaurri
- Historical era: New Imperialism
  - Second French Intervention: 8 December 1861
  - Establishment of the Regency of the Empire: 11 July 1863
  - Emperor Maximilian I executed: 19 June 1867

Population
  - 1865 estimate: 8,259,080
- Currency: Peso
Preceded by	Succeeded by
Second Federal Republic of Mexico	Restored Republic
- Today part of: Mexico

The Second Mexican Empire (Spanish: Segundo Imperio mexicano), officially known as the Mexican Empire (Spanish: Imperio Mexicano), was a constitutional monarchy established in Mexico by Mexican monarchists with the support of the Second French Empire. This period is often referred to as the Second French intervention in Mexico. The French Emperor, Napoleon III, with backing from Mexican conservatives, the clergy, and nobility, aimed to establish a monarchist ally in the Americas as a counterbalance to the growing power of the United States.

The throne of Mexico was offered by Mexican monarchists, who had lost a civil war against Mexican liberals, to Austrian Archduke Maximilian of the House of Habsburg-Lorraine, who had ancestral ties to the rulers of colonial Mexico. Maximilian's ascension was ratified through a controversial referendum. His wife, Belgian princess Charlotte of the House of Saxe-Coburg and Gotha, became the empress consort of Mexico, known locally as "Carlota".

While the French army secured control over central Mexico, supporters of the Mexican Republic continued to resist the Empire through conventional military means and guerrilla warfare. Despite being forced to abandon Mexico City, President Benito Juárez never left Mexican territory, even as he relocated his government multiple times to evade Imperial forces.

Maximilian's regime received recognition from European powers such as the United Kingdom and Austria, as well as from Brazil and China, but it was not recognized by the United States. At the time, the U.S. was engaged in its Civil War (1861–65) and did not formally oppose the Empire during the conflict. However, following the Union's victory over the Confederacy, the U.S. recognized the Republican government and exerted diplomatic pressure on France to withdraw its support. The U.S. did not provide material aid to the Republicans.

With the conclusion of the American Civil War in 1865, the geopolitical situation shifted. Napoleon III began withdrawing French troops from Mexico in 1866, which had been essential to sustaining Maximilian's regime, and ceased further financial support. Maximilian, whose liberal policies alienated many of his conservative backers, attracted some moderate liberal support by endorsing much of the Liberal Reform legislation, though his efforts at further reform were largely unsuccessful.

Despite the increasingly dire military situation, Maximilian refused to abdicate and remained in Mexico after the French troops departed. He was eventually captured by Republican forces in Querétaro, along with his generals Tomás Mejía and Miguel Miramón. The Second Mexican Empire formally ended on 19 June 1867, when Maximilian and his generals were executed by firing squad. The Mexican Republic was restored, having maintained its existence throughout the French intervention and the monarchist regime.

== History ==
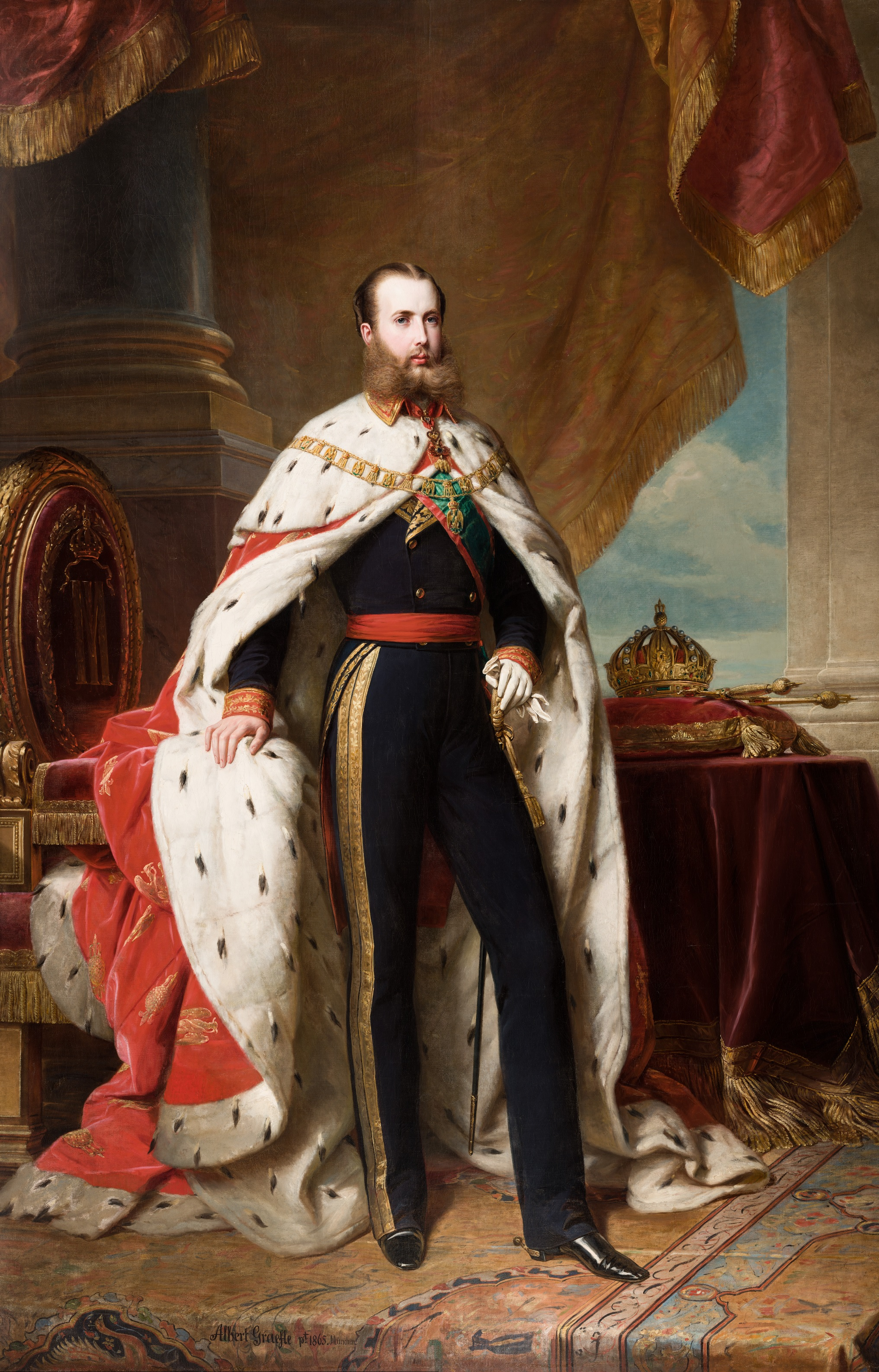
Maximilian I of Mexico by Winterhalter, 1864. This portrait hangs in Chapultepec Castle.

Post-independence Mexico was briefly a monarchy, lasting just over a year, when the emperor abdicated and went into exile, and a federated republic was established in 1824. The idea of monarchy persisted and in 1861, Mexican conservatives and emperor Napoleon III of France brokered a deal to create a new monarchy in Mexico, with Archduke Maximilian agreeing to become emperor, with the military and financial backing of France. The French army ousted Mexican President Benito Juárez from the capital and Maximilian and his wife Carlota arrived in Mexico in 1864. The regime lasted so long as French troops and money supported it but rapidly fell once Napoleon III withdrew that aid.

=== Mexican monarchism ===
After a decade of warfare (1810–21), New Spain gained its independence as Mexico under the leadership of the royalist military commander turned insurgent Agustín de Iturbide, who united insurgents and Spaniards under the Plan of Iguala. The Plan promised independence for Mexico as a monarchy (First Mexican Empire), and also invited a member of Spanish royalty to assume the newly established Mexican throne. After the offer was refused by the Spanish royals, Congress searched for an emperor within the newly independent country. After an armed demonstration by Iturbide's regiment of the Army of the Three Guarantees, the Mexican Congress elected the Mexican-born military officer and leader of independence as the first Mexican emperor. Although during the independence struggle, Mexicans considered the idea of republicanism, "monarchy was the default position." Iturbide's rule as emperor lasted less than two years, but the height of his power lasted only six months. in his attempts to govern, Iturbide struggled to find funds to pay the army and the rest of the government, and closed congress, accusing representatives of obstructionism and idleness, eventually leading to a military uprising against Iturbide and his subsequent abdication. The idea of a monarchy had been discredited for a time, but the idea did not disappear, as many of the disorders associated with the First Empire continued well into the Republican era.

French observers began expressing interest in the idea of a Mexican monarchy as early as 1830. Lorenzo de Zavala claimed that in that year, he was approached by a foreign agent hoping to recruit him in a plan to place an Orléans monarch upon a Mexican throne. In 1840 José María Gutiérrez Estrada wrote a monarchist essay endorsing the idea of a legitimate European monarch being invited to govern Mexico. The pamphlet was addressed to the conservative president Bustamante, who rejected the idea. French diplomats tended to sympathize with the Conservatives in Mexico, Victor de Broglie opining that monarchy was a form of government more suited to Mexico at the time and François Guizot giving a positive review of Estrada's pamphlet.

A monarchist faction in 1846 promoted the idea of establishing a foreign prince at the head of the Mexican government, and president Paredes was viewed as being sympathetic to monarchism, but the project was not pursued due to the more pressing matter of the American invasion of Mexico. The candidate being proposed at the time was the Spanish prince, Don Enrique.

The last official Mexican effort to explore the possibility of establishing a monarchy occurred under the presidency of Santa Anna in the early 1850s, when conservative minister Lucas Alamán directed monarchist diplomats José María Gutiérrez de Estrada and Jose Manuel Hidalgo to seek a European candidate for the Mexican throne. With the overthrow of Santa Anna's government in 1855, these efforts lost their official support and yet Estrada and Hidalgo continued their efforts independently.

=== French invasion and establishment of monarchy ===
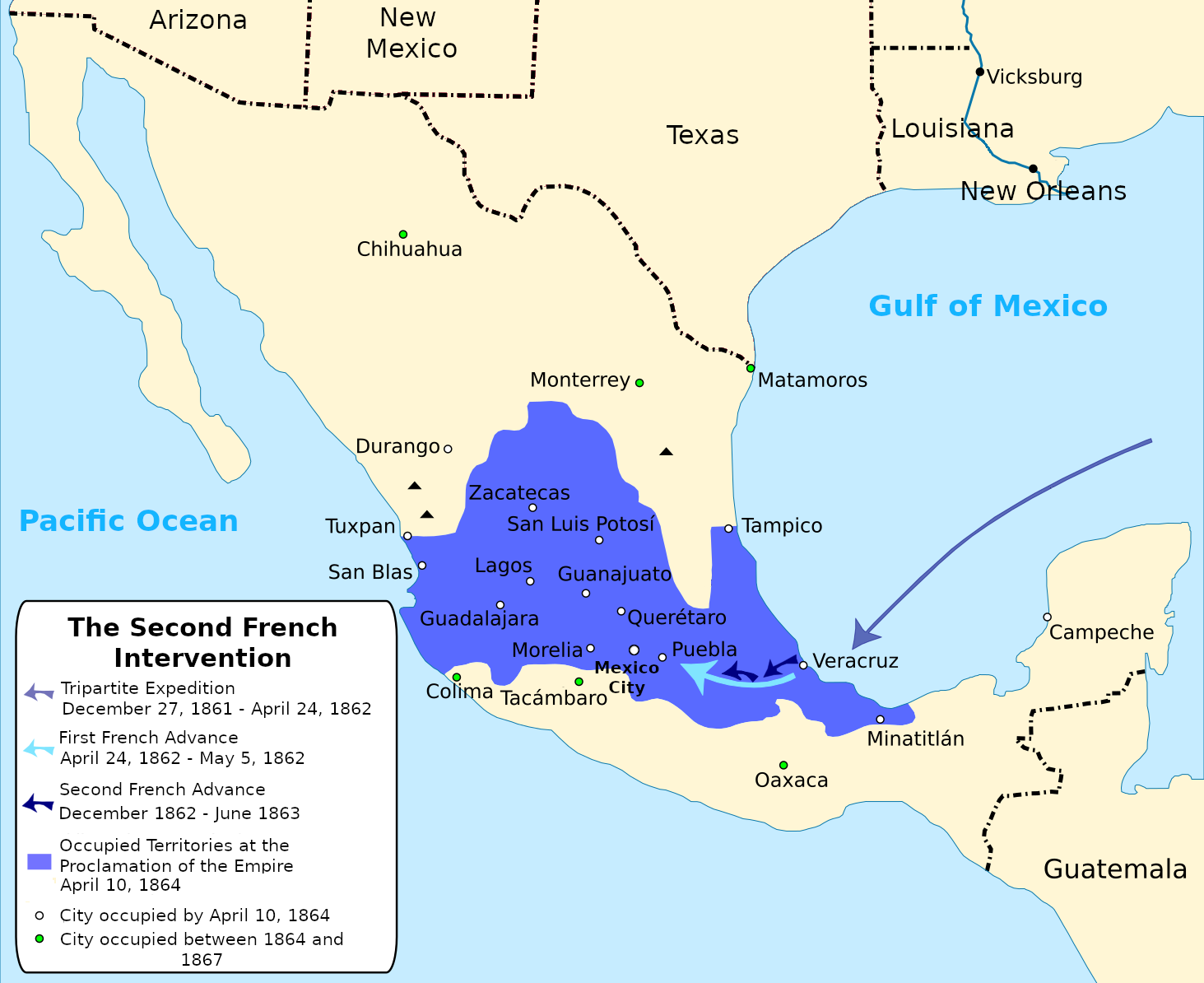
Map of the Intervention

The international situation shifted making a French invasion and establishment of a monarchy in Mexico a real possibility. Conservative Mexican politicians Estrada and Hidalgo managed to get the attention of Emperor Napoleon III of the French, who came to support the idea of reviving the Mexican monarchy and re-establishing a French imperial presence in the Americas. During this time the Second French Empire was establishing a going through a period of colonial expansion. Napoleon III's conquest of Algeria was unpopular and tied with the establishment of an Empire in Mexico. Prior to 1861 any interference in the affairs of Mexico by European powers would have been viewed in the U.S. as a challenge to the Monroe Doctrine. In 1861 however, the U.S. was embroiled in its own conflict, the American Civil War, which made the U.S. government powerless to intervene directly, but it never condoned the French invasion or the regime it established. In July, Mexican President Benito Juárez declared a two-year moratorium on repayment of Mexican debt to France and other nations, much of it loans contracted by the defeated rival conservative government. Napoleon finally had a pretext for armed intervention. Encouraged by his Spanish-born wife, Empress Eugenie, who saw herself as the champion of the Catholic Church in Mexico, Napoleon III took advantage of the situation. Napoleon III saw the opportunity to make France the great modernizing influence in the Western Hemisphere, as well as enabling the country to capture the South American markets. To give him further encouragement, his half-brother, the duc de Morny, was the largest holder of Mexican bonds on which President Juárez had suspended payment.

French troops landed in December 1861 and began military operations in April 1862. They were eventually joined by conservative Mexican generals who had never been entirely defeated in the War of Reform. Charles de Lorencez's small expeditionary force was repulsed at the Battle of Puebla on 5 May 1862, delaying the French push to capture the capital. Reinforcements were sent and placed under the command of Élie Forey. The capital was not taken until a year later in June 1863 and the French now sought to establish a Mexican regime under its influence. Forey appointed a committee of thirty-five Mexicans, the Junta Superior, who then elected three Mexican citizens to serve as the government's executive: Juan Nepomuceno Almonte (the natural son of independence leader José María Morelos), José Mariano Salas, and Pelagio Antonio de Labastida. In turn this triumvirate then selected 215 Mexican citizens to form together with the Junta Superior, an Assembly of Notables.

The Assembly met in July 1863 and resolved to invite Archduke Maximilian to be Emperor of Mexico. The title of the executive triumvirate was formally changed to the Regency of the Mexican Empire. An official delegation left Mexico and arrived in Europe in October. In Europe, Maximilian was continuing negotiations with Napoleon III. He requested a plebiscite to ratify the establishment of the Empire by the Assembly of Notables. The referendum was granted, and the result was affirmative; critics viewed it as illegitimate and suspect due to being conducted by the occupying French authorities. Maximilian also rebuffed French efforts to outright annex the state of Sonora, an act which would later be used in his trial to defend against the Republican government's accusation that Maximilian had been a French puppet. Maximilian formally accepted the crown on 10 April 1864 and set sail for Mexico. He arrived in Veracruz on 28 May and reached the capital on 12 June.

Although French troops controlled the center of the country, the port of Veracruz, the capital Mexico City, and other major cities as north as Monterrey and as south as Oaxaca, President Juárez remained in the national territory, moving north toward the border. In the countryside, republican guerrillas waged warfare against the French troops and their Mexican army allies.

=== Maximilian's reign ===
According to Edward Shawcross, The Mexican Expedition faced backlash from the French government due to its costs, so they decided to lower expenses by installing a man named Archduke Maximilian, the brother of the Austrian Emperor Franz Josef, as Emperor of Mexico. When he took the throne, he agreed to a treaty known as the Miramar Convention with France, which stated that Mexico's government would pay for the costs of the expedition and support the presence of French troops.

Maximilian and Carlota were crowned at the Cathedral of Mexico City. On his arrival in the summer of 1864 Maximilian declared a political amnesty for all liberals who wished to join the Empire, and his conciliation efforts eventually won over some moderate liberals such as José Fernando Ramírez, José María Lacunza, Manuel Orozco y Berra, and Santiago Vidaurri. His first priorities included reforming his ministries and reforming the Imperial Mexican Army, the latter of which was impeded upon by Bazaine in an effort to consolidate French control of the nation.

Maximilian alienated conservative supporters who had brought him to the throne. In December the pope's representative, Papal Nuncio Francesco Meglia, arrived in order to arrange a concordat with the Empire to revise the Reform laws previously passed by the liberal Mexican government. Liberal laws and the Constitution of 1857 nationalized Catholic Church property. Although a Catholic, politically Maximilian was a liberal. The Papal Nuncio's demands that the emperor restore the power and privileges of the Catholic Church resulted in Maximilian confirming the liberal reform laws regarding freedom of religion and the nationalization of Church property. In taking this action, the emperor alienated the Catholic hierarchy and many Mexican conservatives, who had backed Maximilian becoming emperor. The confrontation over the role of the Church produced an atmosphere of crisis. In Mexico City, the disorder was considerable, and Maximilian feared a revolt by Mexican army generals on whom he had relied. He sent Generals Miguel Miramón and Leonardo Márquez out of the country and disbanded the small Mexican army that had supported the empire. That was because those disagreements with the Catholic Church caused conservatives like Remigio Tovar to conspire against the empire, or that Archbishop Pelagio Antonio de Labastida y Dávalos said these judges on Maximilian's supporters:

...the French treasury could have saved the millions invested in the war... and the pastors the pain and vilification of returning from their exile, under the safeguard of this new order of things, to witness the legitimization of the dispossession of their churches and the sanction of the revolutionary principles…I protest of nullity against the attempted deposition, leaving safe the other resources that correspond to my right as Regent and as a Mexican."

— Labastida's speech before the Regency. 20 October 1863.

Maximilian took a number of solo state trips through the nation while Empress Carlota reigned as regent. He went to Querétaro, Guanajuato, and Michoacán, giving public audiences and visiting officials, even celebrating Mexican independence by commemorating the Cry of Dolores in the actual town where it took place.

==== Deteriorating imperial military situation ====
French troops had been able to take considerable Mexican territory from republican forces while the U.S. was embroiled in its civil war, but in April 1865, Union forces defeated the secessionist Confederate States of America after four years of bloody combat. The U.S. government was reluctant to enter a direct conflict with France to enforce the Monroe Doctrine prohibiting European powers in the Americas, but official U.S. government sympathy remained with Mexican president Benito Juárez. The U.S. government had refused to recognize the Empire and also ignored Maximilian's correspondence. In December 1865, a $30 million private American loan was approved for Juárez, indicating a confidence that he would return to power, and American volunteers joined the Mexican republican troops. An unofficial American raid occurred near Brownsville, and Juárez's minister to the United States, Matías Romero, proposed that General Grant or General Sherman intervene in Mexico to help the republican cause. The United States refrained from direct military intervention, but it put diplomatic pressure on France to leave Mexico.

A concentration of French troops in the northern republican strongholds of Mexico led to a surge of republican guerrilla activity in the south. While French troops controlled major cities, guerrillas continued to be a major military threat in the countryside, which affected Imperial military planning. Troops had to be concentrated and operate in areas where guerrillas could not easily cut them off and eliminate them. In an effort to combat the increasing violence and in a belief that Juárez was outside of the national territory, Maximilian in October signed an order at the urging of the French military commander Bazaine, the so-called "Black Decree". It mandated the court martial and execution of anyone found either aiding or participating with the guerrillas against the Imperial government. Although the harsh measure was not unprecedented in Mexican history, resembling an 1862 measure by Juárez, it proved to be widely reviled, and contributed to the growing unpopularity of the Empire.

In January 1866, seeing the war as unwinnable, Napoleon III declared to the French Chambers that he intended to withdraw the French military from Mexico. At this point, the U.S. government was no longer preoccupied militarily with winning the Civil War and could enforce the Monroe Doctrine against foreign intervention in the hemisphere. Maximilian's request to France for more aid or at least a delay in troop withdrawals was defused nominally because a possible war against Prussia was coming, so despite the sunk costs of the French occupation, abandoning the enterprise was France's strategic decision. Empress Carlota arrived in Europe in an attempt to plead for the Empire's cause, but she was unable to gain France's support.

==== Conservative and traditionalist turn in the government ====
However, by July 1866, there was an increasingly conservative and reactionary turn in the government to avoid the military crisis, influenced by Archbishop Labastida y Dávalos and Clemente de Jesús Munguía letters to Maximilian with harsh criticism to his policy influenced by Bonapartism, declaring that the establishment of the empire had been due more to the desire of the population to see the liberal laws repealed than to the existence of a true monarchical tradition in the country.

This was due to the measures suggested and taken by the political advisors that Emperor Maximilian had, while they noted that the indigenous, and in general the common Mexican, clung to traditionalist New Spanish ways of life, being stubborn in their customs as a traditional society and communitarians form of life that were alien to the Modernization project of the liberal and Individualist-egalitarian model, coming mostly from the Europeanizing Criollo elites, which the indigenous people did not seem willing to follow and showing indifferent or even opposed attitudes to the notions of Equality before the law, while they wanted their inherited differences restored, that was, to have again the legal recognition of their distinction as "Indian" in the fueros of the Indian political society during the Spanish imperial era (in fact, quite a few appeals were made in the government according to the Siete Partidas of Alfonso X of Castile until the Novísima Recopilación), especially in terms of communal property and its legal existence as an indigenous community, to subsist and exist as such in contrast to the criollo or the mestizos, and not just a generic recognition as a Mexican/citizen-owner (so in the complaints from several indigenous peoples were referred to Reales Cedulas).

This caused the government to become increasingly "counterrevolutionary", distancing itself more and more from the original ideas of only moderating the consequences of the liberal revolution of the reform war. There was also a constant concern against Criollo landowners who wanted to appropriate the communal lands from the Indians, who wanted the return of institutions from the Ancient Regime such as the Protector of the Indians, rather than being unprotected in equality with the whites.

Making the empire distance itself from Mexican Republican Liberalism to the extent that it approached the Protectionist measures demanded by social conservatives, inspired by Derecho Indiano and the Laws of the Indies (and even some positions of the utopian Socialism of the rural proletariat, since Maximilian was influenced by Victor Considerant), instead of longing for the assimilation of the Indian through the political destruction of the indigenous community (as would end up happening in future Mexican governments promoting Peonage) as a means to obtain the desired social transformation by the bourgeois-liberal revolutionaries, who considered that a differentiated category such as "Indian", understood as a subject of law without the same duties as "whites", implied a delay in the transition from subjects to citizens in national development.

For this reason, laws would be decreed in a nature that were increasingly distant from the liberal ideology, such as the laws of July and September 1865 that reestablished the legal personality of the indigenous communities (abolishing Equality before the law), the agrarian law of 16 September 1866 (the most radical) that granted lands to indigenous communities that lacked legal property and ejido, continuing the law of 26 June on repartimientos (citing the New Spain period) and restoration of community lands (annulling the transition to a regime liberal of Private Property) which said the following:

"They will be divided into fractions and awarded as property to the residents of the towns to which they belong and have the right to them, the poor being preferred to the rich, the married the single and those who have families to those who do not have one.. .", however, "the lands destined exclusively for the public service of the towns, the waters and the mountains, whose uses are made directly by the residents of the towns to which they belong will not be distributed or awarded..." and "Those who acquire land under this law may only sell or lease it to individuals who do not have other territorial property."

Finally, after what were considered serious political errors by his supporters, Maximilian would again propose a new concordat in 1866, this time under the direct influence of Archbishop Pelagio and a council of Mexican bishops, who predicted greater Orthodoxy with Catholic doctrine, repealing rights and reforms influenced by liberalism (condemned by the church), renouncing their Regalist claims of the patronage (after failing a draft agreement from the previous year), and in turn finally returning the church properties. However, it was very late to regain the support from the conservative and traditionalist Mexicans.

Thus, according to Jean Meyer, Maximilian acted, more than as a liberal, as an enlightened Despot (closer to Bourbon Reformism), who would try to take advantage of the elements of Tradition and Modernity, taking extreme measures that contradicted classical and economic Liberalism, drawing on the "old" Indian legislation, or the "modern" proposal of socialism, in addition to the ideas of Cameralism (very popular in the Germanic states) that gave importance to small peasant property compared to the lordly latifundia, expressed in the Urbarium Code of 1767 (which established the plots of the Hungarian peasants and prohibited their lord from seizing them).

But this did not imply the end of the confiscations, not giving up the liberal and enlightened desire to overcome feudal communal property by modern private property as a natural and absolute right (in contrast to the traditional conception of it as a secondary natural right), together with the idealized conception of the indigenous in Mexican liberalism as that of a potential owner who would have to be transformed into a citizen and owner of his property, so that would be capable of legally defending its property by itself, like any other criollo or mestizo in the Social Contract. Then, avoiding what happened in modern Mexico that liberals leaves the indigenous outside the law, being a vulnerable subject and without defense mechanisms against the landowners and speculators, seeking to favor the Indian over the landowner through protection mechanisms for the "clases menesterosas" or needy classes (which granted them a protective board on 10 April 1865, to favor the dispossessed classes of the empire) in said social transition.

=== Fall of the empire ===
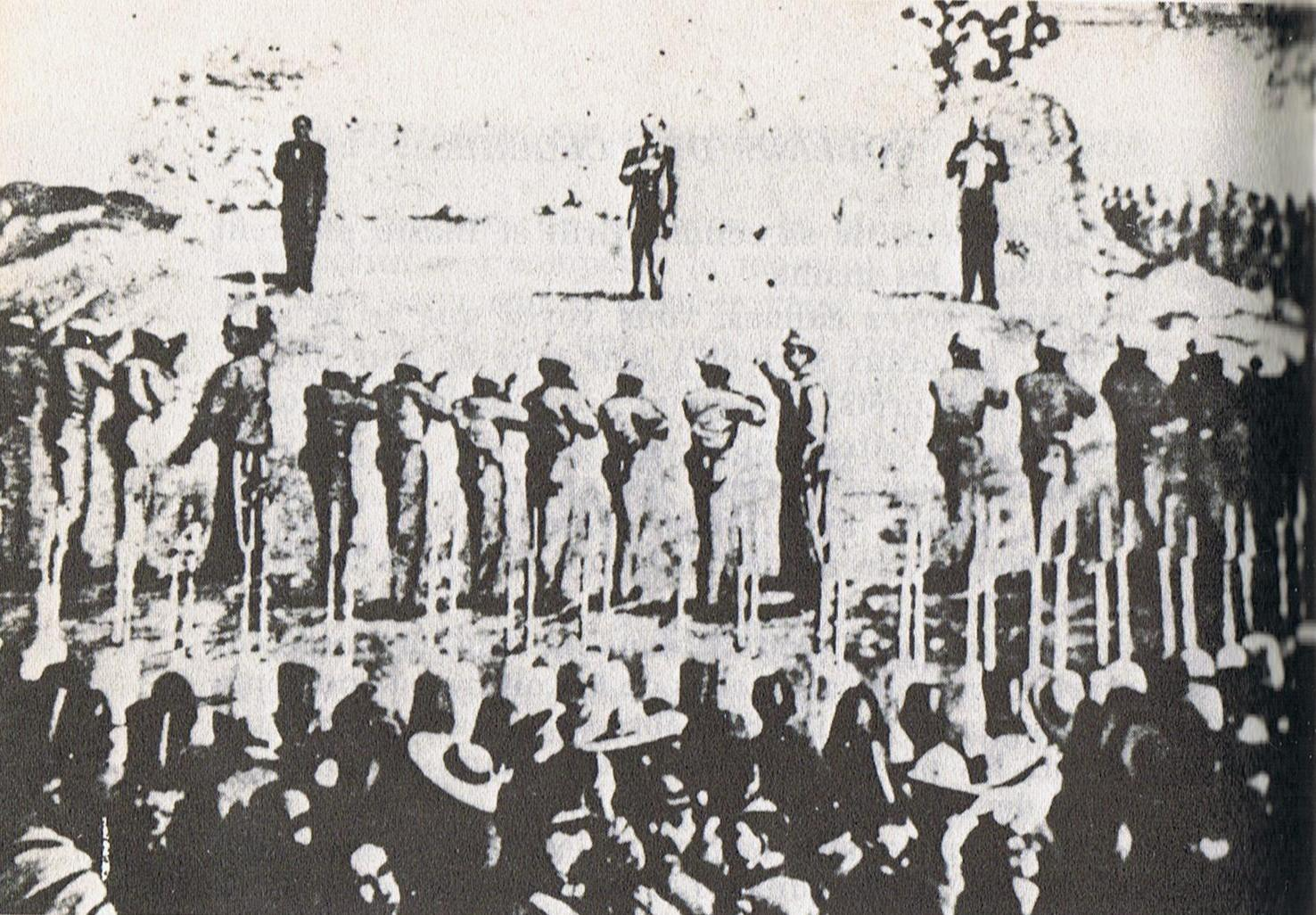
Photograph of a reenactment of the Execution of Maximilian I of Mexico, and Generals Miramón and Mejía. Left to right: Mejía, Miramón, and Maximilian.

As France withdrew its military, Maximilian's empire was headed toward collapse. In October 1866 Maximilian moved his cabinet from the capital to Orizaba, near the Gulf Coast port of Veracruz. He was widely rumored to be leaving Mexico. He contemplated abdication, and on 25 November held a council of his ministers to address the crisis faced by the Empire. They narrowly voted against abdication and Maximilian headed back towards the capital. He intended to appeal to the nation in order to hold a national assembly which would then decide what form of government the Mexican nation was to take. Such a measure however would require a ceasefire from Juárez. The president of the republic would never consider an offer from the foreigner placed on the throne by Juárez's Mexican political enemies with the aid of a foreign power. Republican army troops on the ground were fighting to defeat those supporting the emperor.

After the hopeless national assembly project fell through, Maximilian focused on military operations. In February 1867, the last of the occupying French troops departed for France. Maximilian headed for the city of Querétaro, north of the capital, to join the bulk of his Mexican troops, numbering about 10,000 men. Republican generals Escobedo and Corona converged on Querétaro with 40,000 men. The city held out until being betrayed by an imperial officer who opened the gates to the liberals on 15 May 1867.

Maximilian was captured and placed on trial with his leading generals Mejía and Miramón. All three were tried, sentenced to death and executed on 19 June 1867 by the republican army.

== Government ==
A provisional statute was published in 1865, which laid the basic framework of the government. The emperor was to govern through nine ministries: of the Imperial Household, of State, of Foreign Relations, of War, of Government or Interior, of the Treasury, of Justice, of Public Instruction and Worship, and of Development. These ministries (except that of the Imperial Household) comprised the Council of Ministers, which discussed the affairs that the emperor referred to them. The emperor had the power to appoint the Minister of the Imperial Household and the Minister of State, and in turn, the Minister of State, which was ex officio the President of the Council of Ministers, was to appoint the rest of the Ministers. A Council of State was given the power to frame bills and give advice to the emperor, and a separate private cabinet, serving as the emperor's liaison, was divided into civil and military affairs. Empress Carlota was given the right to serve as regent if under certain circumstances Maximilian was to be unavailable, making her the first woman to ever govern Mexico. As a result of her appointment to regency, she is considered to be the first woman to rule in the Americas.

Maximilian had many plans for Mexico, clearly not expecting his reign to be so short. In 1865, the imperial regime drew up plans to reorganize Mexican national territory and issued eight volumes of laws covering all aspects of government, including forest management, railroads, roads, canals, postal services, telegraphs, mining, and immigration. The emperor passed legislation guaranteeing equality before the law and freedom of speech, and laws meant to defend the rights of laborers, especially indigenous workers. Maximilian attempted to pass a law guaranteeing the natives a living wage and outlawing corporal punishment for them, along with limiting their inheritance of debts. The measures faced backlash from the cabinet, but were ultimately passed during one of Carlota's regencies. Labor laws in Yucatán actually became harsher on workers after the fall of the Empire. A national system of free schools was also planned based on the German gymnasia and the emperor founded an Imperial Mexican Academy of Science and Literature.

Maximilian also established the Imperial Order of the Mexican Eagle as an award for extraordinary merits and services to the empire, for outstanding civil or military service, and outstanding achievements in the fields of science and art. It was considered the highest and most exclusive award during the Second Mexican Empire.

Maximilian aimed to promote the development of the country by opening up the nation to immigration, regardless of race. An immigration agency was set up to promote immigration from the United States, the former Confederate States, Europe, and Asia. Colonists were to be granted citizenship at once, and gained exemption from taxes for the first year, and an exemption from military services for five years. Some of the most prominent colonization settlements were the Villa Carlota and the New Virginia Colony.

=== Indigenous policy ===
The Second French intervention in Mexico was a much more complex social process than popularly believed, this is because the conservative side and the Empire received great support, not only because of the known participation of the power groups (the clergy and the mostly Criollo landowning oligarchy), but also of a large part of the Indigenous Nations and other popular communities (especially of a rural nature), a phenomenon little studied in the dominant Mexican Historiography. According to the chronicles or stories published by newspapers of the time (such as La Sociedad), it was recorded that many communities presented themselves happily upon the arrival of the imperial couple to Mexico (under a Hispanic baroque ceremonial, which integrate popular indigenous folklore), evidencing an immediate indigenous adhesion to the Empire, nostalgic for the Laws of the Indies of the viceregal era. Later, the imperial couple would visit multiple locations to verify institutions, such as schools, hospitals, military barracks, prisons, churches, etc. Press reports of the time denounced the sincere interest of the monarchs in serving the Indians, wanting to give a message of paternalistic and pro-indigenous sovereigns, so they visited the families of the indigenous peoples (they even rested in their huts), received representatives of their communities (holding dinners with the Caciques and promising that they would learn their languages), made donations (with their personal funds and not those of the state) to finance the poor and the construction of infrastructure, going as far as adopting poor Indians. According to Rafael García Granados a Mexican historian "A good part of the indigenous communities, from a perspective and interests completely different from those presented by the elite committed to the project of the Second Empire, noticed that the change from the republic to the empire favored them," when writing on the subject.

This behavior of the monarchist indigenous cannot be classified as some act of "betrayal of the country", and it is necessary to understand the situation in which the different indigenous peoples found themselves in the 1860s to explain the causes of such development. The Reform Laws had not only alienated the properties of the Catholic Church, but also those of indigenous communities (which mostly were allies of catholic clergy). These policies undertaken by the liberal government were not simple measures guided by some racism or perversity, but rather the liberalism embedded in the ruling classes of Mexico could not understand, nor did it seek to accept, the communal ownership of the land that the indigenous communities maintained for thousands of years. For the liberals of the time, property had a meaning only as "individual proprietorship", the rest was seen as outdated and feudal conceptions. According to Martínez Ibarra "The conservative side was not a monolithic group made up solely of whites belonging to the Mexican elite; this conception is totally wrong, since the largest component was indigenous." Given this, the "Law of Confiscation of Civil and Religious Communities" of 25 June 1856, issued after the Reform War, was considered a declaration of a war against "the Indian", who was seen as a discordant element in the development of a "modern national identity" (based on the Equality before the law, intentionally ignoring the differences between criollos and indigenous, unlike on República de Indios of the Spanish era, which juridically recognised it and protect indigenous institutions). A newspaper of the time said in this regard that Mexico was on the verge of an inter-ethnic civil war because of the reform, as indigenous opposed Political modernization and defended a Traditionalist conception of social and political life:

"The abuses that have been committed under the pretext of the Confiscation and Nationalization Laws have left the unhappy Indians in such a state of misery and abandonment that we are daily amazed at how a caste war has not broken out throughout Mexico."

— Mexican Newspaper

"Indigenous communities saw the liberal Constitution as a threat to their communal way of life."

— Martínez Ibarra, 1965

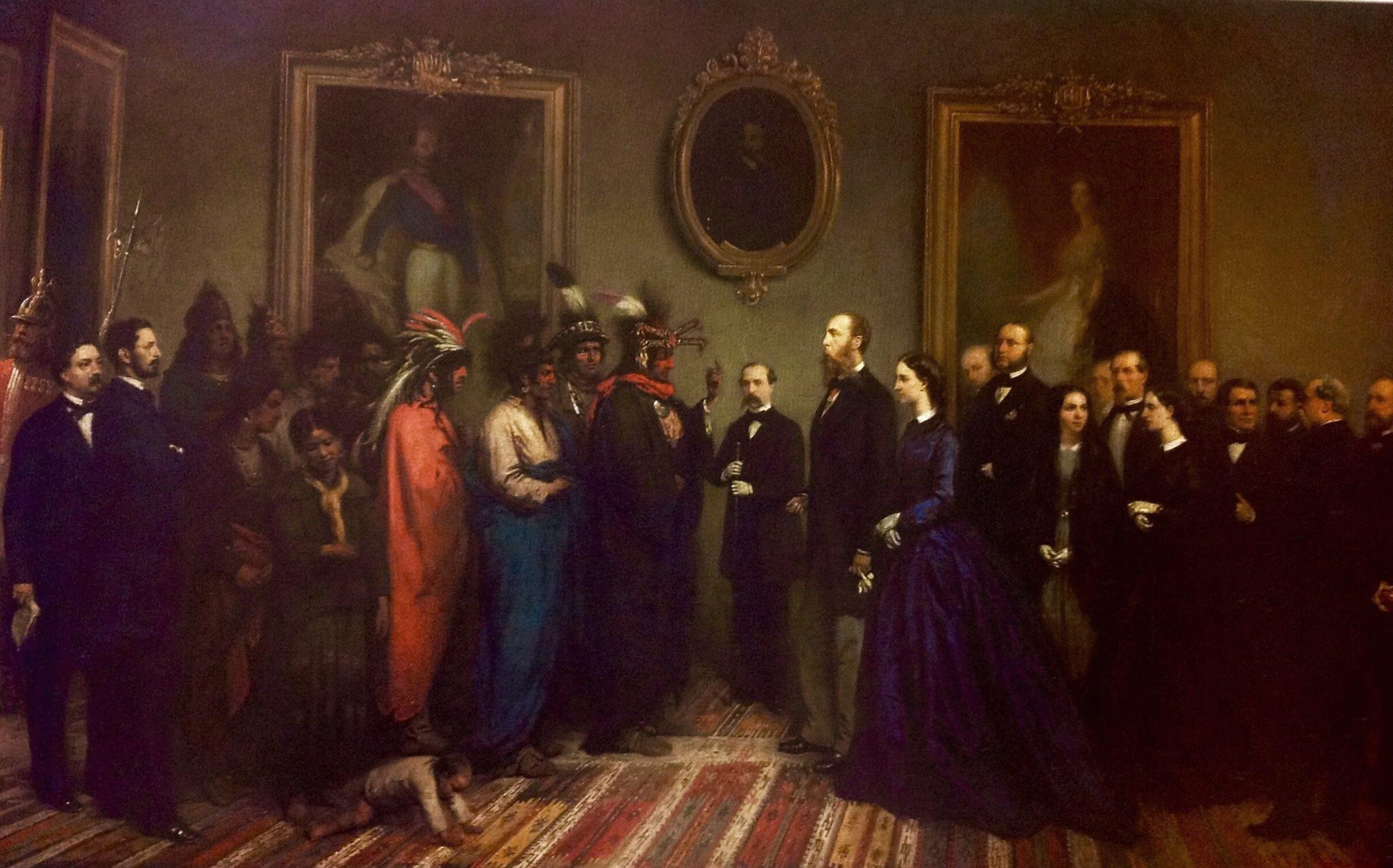
A delegation of the Kickapoo people being received at the royal court.

Thus, with notable exceptions such as the communities of Guerrero (loyals to the republican) and the peoples who were at war directly with the "white man" (such as the Apaches or the Mayans of Yucatán during Caste War) and remained on the sidelines while fighting against any authority installed in Mexico City and its representatives, most of the different indigenous peoples of Mexico joined the imperial cause in a great monarchical alliance (dreaming of the fall of the republican-liberal government that sought to strip them of their ancestral lands), such as: The Pames and Otomíes with General Tomás Mejía, the Purépechas with General Juan Nepomuceno Almonte, the Coras, Huichols and Mexicas with the General Manuel Lozada, the Pimas, Opatas, Yaquis, Mayos, Seris, Kikapues and Tarahumaras with their respective caciques. Even the Zacapoaxtlas, who gained fame in the Battle of Puebla in 1862, ended up joining the imperial side around 1863, led by Captain Zenobio Cantero. Many Indians served the imperial cause as explorers, translators and guides, others as counter-guerrillas, and still others as volunteers for the Imperial Army. Even occasionally, some Yucatecan indigenous chiefs (in war against the "white man") said they recognized the authority of the emperor (even traveling to the capital), to later continue developing a Caste War with uprisings against any authority foreign to them. The Imperial Commissioner of Yucatán, José Salazar Ilarregui, for example, would launch a proclamation in Spanish and Mayan to indigenous people of Chan Santa Cruz, with a conciliatory tone to recruit their participation (along with the promise of distributing vacant lands), after having previously been sent by the Empire as a "defense lawyer" to make reports on the complaints and litigation of the Indians to help them.

In this context, the attitude of the indigenous peoples must also be understood when the Juarista, Pedro Pruneda, contemptuously pointed out that the "Indians everywhere expressed fanatical enthusiasm for Maximiliano." Similar opinions are those of General Miguel Negrete who said that "these imbecile Indians have allowed themselves to be seduced by the French" or those of Guillermo Prieto, who described them beforehand as "lazy, parasitic, similar to cankers", and many others who They called them "Indians who were traitors to their country." Not only with their opinions did the liberal republicans distance themselves from the indigenous peoples of the country, for having put all the country's resources at the service of "the cause of the Republic" (which at the same time sought to eradicate the multiple indigenous cultural identities that were conflictive to the modernizing project) but that the Juaristas, based on the state of war, confiscated from the indigenous lands everything they required (food, accommodation and animals), while the French, Austrians and Belgians, in general, paid for what they took. In addition to all this, the emperors Maximilian and Carlota prohibited the "levy", a practice that the republican armies systematically carried out to force the indigenous people to fight in their ranks, taking men from their communities when they could. Despite this many generals, top leaders (including the president Benito Juárez) and most guerilla fighters against the Empire were indigenous.

Even Maximilian made efforts to learn Nahuatl. So, in the Mexican Empire, the Laws were published both in Spanish and in Nahuatl, the Aztec language, and Maximilian appointed leading Nahuatl scholar Faustino Galicia as an advisor to his government.

The Empire placed an emphasis on Mexican history and culture, with Maximilian commissioning Mexican painters Rafael Flores, Santiago Rebull, Juan Urruchi, and Petronilo Monroy, to produce works depicting Mexican history, religious subjects, and portraits of Mexican rulers, including the imperial sovereigns themselves. The prefects governing the provinces were instructed to protect archeological artifacts and Maximilian wrote to Europe asking the return of native artifacts that had been taken out of the country during the Spanish conquest, including articles that had belonged to Moctezuma II, and an Aztec codex.

Finally, on 6 June and 15 September 1865, Maximilian promulgated laws that restored legal personality to the indigenous communities and recognized their right to collective possession of their ancestral or government-granted lands (like on times of Spanish Empire monarchy). It is not surprising that although forced recruitment was prohibited in his army, he had numerous volunteers from indigenous peoples. The indigenous component not only joined the lower echelons of the Mexican Empire, but they were part of the new aristocracy that would govern (restoring the Indigenous nobility), being the most ideal in the case of a country with a predominant indigenous component in terms of its number of inhabitants. Characters such as Faustino Chimalpopoca or Josefa Varela, heirs of the ancient tlatoanis, undertook the creation of indigenous intellectual circles close to the Court, whose mission was to rescue and disseminate the ancestral culture, as well as advise the emperors Carlota and Maximilian on matters concerning the indigenous communities that many times, because they were Europeans, they did not understand.

Many of Maximilian's reforms were simply revivals of previous Mexican legislation (mostly the Derecho Indiano of Spanish Era). Franciso Arrangoiz who had been Maximilian's minister to Britain, Holland, and Belgium, later accused Maximilian of passing such reforms to gain favorable public opinion in Europe, and to give the impression that he had a 'creative genius' and was 'lifting Mexico out of barbarism.'

At Chapultepec Palace on Sundays, Maximilian and Carlota frequently held audiences with people from all social and economic segments, including Mexico's Indigenous Communities.

=== Religious policy ===
Despite initial conflicts, a papal nuncio arrived in the capital of Mexico on 7 December 1864 (just 6 months after Maximilian) in which he requested that they proceed as requested in Pius IX's letter of 18 October 1864:

- "Predispose with the cooperation of the bishops the complete and desired reorganization of ecclesiastical affairs."
- "To repair the evils of the revolution (...) let the Catholic Religion, excluding all other dissident cults, continue to be the glory and support of the Mexican nation."
- "May the bishops be free in the exercise of their ministry" and "the religious orders be reestablished and reformed in accordance with the powers and instructions communicated by us."
- "That the heritage of the Church, with its relative rights, be protected and protected"
- "Whoever is not allowed to teach or publish false or subversive maxims."
- "That public and private education be directed and supervised by the ecclesiastical authority."
- "Let the ties that have the Church under the dependence and will of the civil government be removed."

Despite the good will of the Holy See to resolve the differences, Maximilian had offered, on 17 December 1864, a counteroffer (of a regalist nature, conflictive to the ultramontanist tendences in Rome) in a 9-point concordat, which highlighted the following:

- "The Mexican government tolerates all cults that were prohibited by the laws of the country, but grants special protection to the Catholic, apostolic, Roman religion."
- "The public treasury will provide for the expenses of worship and will pay its ministers, in the same way, in the same proportion and under the same title as the other civil servants of the State."
- "Catholic priests will administer the sacraments free of charge, without being able to charge the faithful."
- "The Church transfers to the government all its income from ecclesiastical property, which has been declared national during the Republic."

There were many privileges that Maximian offered to the church, against accusations of being a liberal-modernist heretic, and wanting to protect the Catholic tradition against political modernization from radical liberals. However, the issue of freedom of religion was thorny, considering that in his army there were Muslims (Egyptian and Algerian Mamluks), Orthodox volunteers and volunteer Protestant troops from the Confederate States, Bohemia and Slovakia, so having guaranteed a partial freedom of religion worship could have generated some disputes with those volunteer troops, so it became understandable why he had to be tolerant for pragmatic reasons, despite the claims of his duties as a Catholic to abide by the church's condemnations of an unlimited religious freedom. Furthermore, on Charlotte's part, there were proposals to promote the migration of settlers from all over the world to take advantage of the Mexican lands, with religious tolerance being necessary to achieve such a cosmopolitan project. At the same time, her claims to wanting to restore the right of the patronato and undermining the autonomy of the ecclesiastical jurisdiction (like it was being doing on the Austrian Empire with Josephinism). All this would put him in clear contradiction with the principles of Pius IX that he had been reminded of.

Still, Charlotte would insist that, like her grandmother, she was submissive to the decrees of the church as she was a sincere catholic devout (although, like the Church of France, she had been raised with the absolutist belief, condemned by the church as Gallican heresy, that a king, by his temporal Power, was master of his House, and the church should not change that secularism), and in a letter addressed to Eugenia de Montijo on 18 June 1864, Empress Carlota still declared that the imperial adventure was something of a religious nature, stating at her entrance to the capital that:

"The sight of the Virgin of Guadalupe has impressed me greatly; the homage paid to the protector of the Indians by a descendant of Charles V (Maximilian of Habsburg) ready to sit on Montezuma's throne was like a great historical reparation..."

— Empress Charlotte of Mexico

However, Maximilian was demonstrating Regalist positions, also shared by the French military leaders, presenting the conviction that the Church should submit to the crown while the clergy should act in a similar way to public officials who would be financed by the state. and not with the economic independence of the Holy See with its self-financing (which explains, according to the Mexican philosopher, Héctor Zagal, the confusion about Maximilian's apparent liberalism, because both political doctrines affirm the same subordination of the church to a modern State, but Maximilian, due to his Austrian imperial education, was a follower of pre-liberal ideals), which would continue to lead him into hostilities against the Catholic Church as an institutional and doctrinal body that condemned such heterodoxies and dogmatically defended the independence of the Church from the will of the civil government in the Syllabus of Pius IX, making an understanding almost impossible without Maximilian giving in (something he would not initially achieve in his search to achieve an understanding under his terms). In turn, the Empress Charlotte, probably because of the education of her father (Leopold I of Belgium, accused by traditionalists of having Lutheran and Masonic influences), she would also make hostile statements towards political Catholicism in order to promote the project of consolidating a new Patronato through the Concordate:

"On Saturday (the Nuncio) will be received by the emperor and on his part he sent the project of the concordat (he does not use the term neo-patronage). I find it perfectly worded, because at first glance it seems harmless and is not very liberal (... ) the position of the government of this country is different from what France was when the first consul (Napoleon Bonaparte) governed it and knew well that France was too Catholic to do without a State religion (...) this country is only moderately Catholic (…) the pseudo-Catholicism formed by the Conquest with the mixture of the religion of the Indians, died with the assets of the clergy, which were its main base."

— Letter from Empress Charlotte dated December 8, 1864

Carlota's pious friend, Carolina de Grunne, constantly suggested that she be more prudent and reach an agreement with the Vatican, saying that it was preferable to be ruler of an ignorant people like the Mexican (in a good sense of being ignorant of liberal ideologies that promoted bad customs), than a people like the Parisian where they no longer respected the sacraments of the church.

After the conflict between the clergy and Maximilian got stuck, the Archbishop Pelagio Antonio de Labastida y Dávalos and a council of Mexican bishops in 1866 would make a Concordat with more orthodoxy with Catholic social teaching, being more in line with Integralism than Catholic liberalism (which was condemned as heresy). This was due to the near defeat of the Empire and the pression from political assessors on Maximilian, suggesting him to act as an autenthic catholic in politics (so, acting more as a traditionalist) to regain the supports from Mexican conservatives, who were the only ones who could defend his empire after the withdrawal of French troops. That concordat stated the following points:

- "The Roman Catholic apostolic religion, the only true one, continues to be that of the Mexican nation and will always be preserved in it or in the State with all the rights and prerogatives that it must enjoy according to the law of God and the provisions of the sacred canons."
- "The bishops will exercise their right to examine and censor, in accordance with the provisions of the Holy Council of Trent, all books and productions that for any reason are intended for the public and in any way refer to the dogmas of the faith, the rules of morality and ecclesiastical discipline. The civil authority will provide the bishops with assistance and assistance so that the provisions they dictate in support of religion are fulfilled."
- "The Roman pontiff having by divine right the primacy of honor and jurisdiction throughout the Church, the bishops, people and clergy will communicate freely with the Holy See. Consequently, the regio exequatur is repealed, reserving, however, his right "to the authorities to previously settle by common agreement, ecclesiastical issues that may affect civil order and that are not settled by this agreement."
- "His Majesty of him the emperor acknowledges:"
- "He will cause the diocesans of the Empire to enter immediately after this concordat is ratified or published, into possession of all the property that has not been alienated in accordance with the so-called Reform laws or that, having been so, have come into the power of the government as a result of the same. laws, or the revision decreed on 26 February 1865."
- "It is declared that the assets returned to the Church are free of any liability extraneous to the burdens of its foundation, and that the government is bound by the claims made by those who are or are judged to be creditors of said assets."
- "With special emphasis, the seminaries and also the schools or educational houses for both sexes that were in charge of the Church will be ordered to be returned to the Church. When such return is not possible, the government, in agreement with the diocesan government, will provide for the seminary one or some of the convent buildings is to the object."

=== Social policy ===
Regarding measures to favor the dispossessed, the statute of the empire abolished hereditary debts, prohibited child labor, physical punishment, and forced employers to give one day of rest a week and schools to the children of their employees, decreed the eight-hour work day and abolished strip shops among many other laws and decrees in favor of the most disadvantaged Mexicans. For its part, the Junta Protectora de Clases Menesterosas (formed to serve the promulgated laws that) regulate work in the countryside, inter-ethnic conflicts or over the ownership of land and water, safeguarding the community lands of the Indians (usually inherited from the Repartimientos), provision of property (through repartition policies) to those dispossessed of legal property and ejidos, measures to solve th extremely poor situation of indigenous people, peasants, laborers and workers in the face of the new dynamics of industrial society. In addition, debates were held about the place of the indigenous people in society and how to protect them, as well as studies to understand the economic and social state of the Mexican masses in order to resolve their disagreements (especially of the most dispossessed classes). To a large extent, the origin of these laws was due both to addressing the very poor situation of the Indians and dispossessed (after the confiscations) that he inherited, and to Maximiliano's own philanthropic personality and his anguish generated by the situation he saw in his personal experiences and observations (especially when coming into contact with the indigenous people in the departments visited) that prompted him to "improve the condition of those unfortunate classes as effectively as possible."

He also promoted the abolition of slavery among Confederate migrants from the southern United States who requested a colonization project from Maximilian in exchange for helping them defend themselves from American attacks, by declaring that blacks who set foot in Mexico were free men.

== Economy ==
=== Railways ===
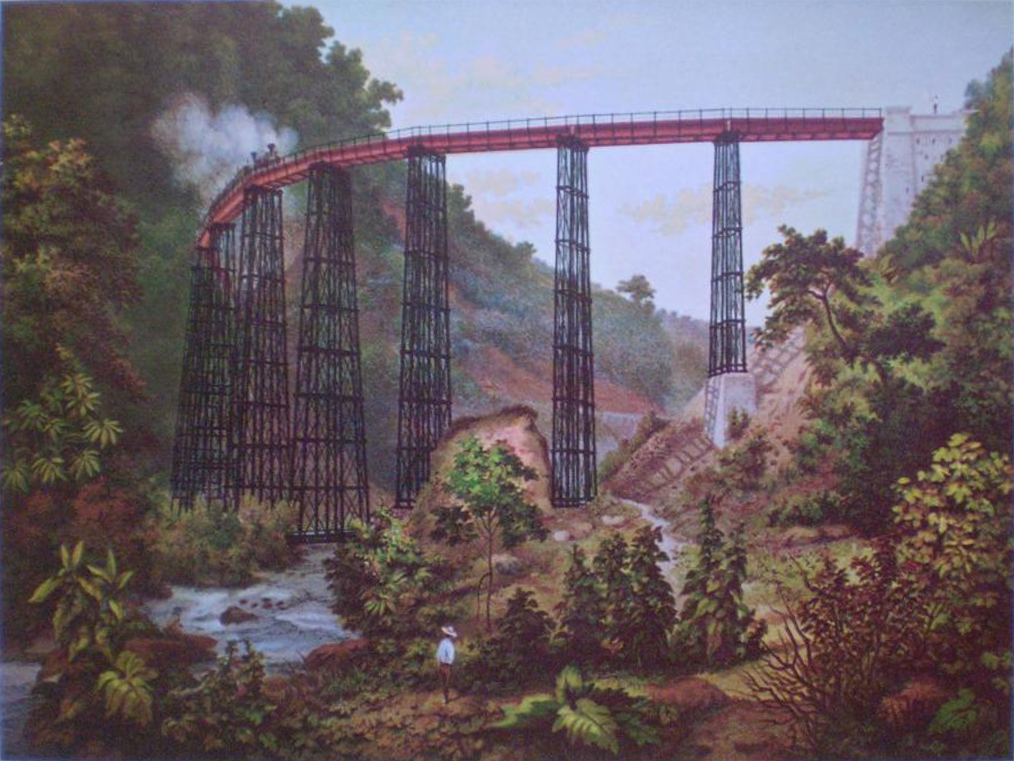
Mexican Railway, Bridge by José María Velasco Gómez 1877.

One of the main challenges encountered by the Emperor was the lack of sufficient infrastructure to link the different parts of the realm. The main goal was connecting the port of Veracruz and the capital in Mexico City. In 1857, Don Antonio Escandón secured the right to build a line from the port of Veracruz to Mexico City and on to the Pacific Ocean. Revolution and political instability stifled progress on the financing or construction of the line until 1864, when, under the regime of Emperor Maximilian, the Imperial Mexican Railway Company began construction of the line. Political upheaval continued to stifle progress, and the initial segment from Veracruz to Mexico City was inaugurated nine years later on 1 January 1873 by President Sebastián Lerdo de Tejada.

In 1857 the original proprietors of the government concession, the Masso Brothers, inaugurated on 4 July the train service from Tlatelolco, in México City, to the nearby town of Guadalupe Hidalgo. Eventually they ran out of funds and decided to sell it to Manuel Escandón and Antonio Escandón. The Escandón Brothers continued working and the project, and Antonio Escandón visited the United States and England in the last months of the year. In the first country, he hired Andrew Talcott, and in the latter, he sold company stock. Exploration of a route from Orizaba to Maltrata was performed by engineers Andrew H. Talcott and Pascual Almazán.

During the French intervention, parts of the railways were destroyed. The only option available was the establishment of a pact between the French Army, and the two companies of the Escandón Brothers. The French Army was to provide a subsidy to the companies of 120 000 francs a month for the works, and the companies were to establish service from Veracruz to Soledad para by May, actually concluding on 15 August 1862, concluding 41 kilometres of tracks. Next, they reached the Camarón station, with a length of 62 kilometres. By 16 October 1864 they reached Paso del Macho with a length of 76 kilometres.

On 19 September 1864, the Imperial Mexican Railway Company (Compañía Limitada del Ferrocarril Imperial Mexicano) was Incorporated in London to complete the earlier projects and continued construction on this line. Escandón ceded his privileges to the new company. Smith, Knight and Co. was later contracted in 1864 by the Imperial Mexican Railway to continue work on the line from Mexico City to Veracruz. William Elliot was employed as Chief Assistant for three years on the construction of about 70 miles of the heaviest portion of the Mexican Railway, after which he returned to England. He had several years of experience building railways in England, India, and Brazil. In this last country, he held the position of Engineer-in-Chief of the province of São Paulo.

Maximiliano I hired engineer M Lyons for the construction of the line from La Soledad to Monte del Chiquihuite, later on joining the line from Veracruz to Paso del Macho. Works were begun in Maltrata, at the same time that the works from Veracruz and Mexico City kept moving forward. By the end of the Empire in June 1867, 76 kilometers from Veracruz to Paso del Macho were functional (part of the concession to Lyons) and the line from Mexico City reached Apizaco with 139 km.

=== Banking ===
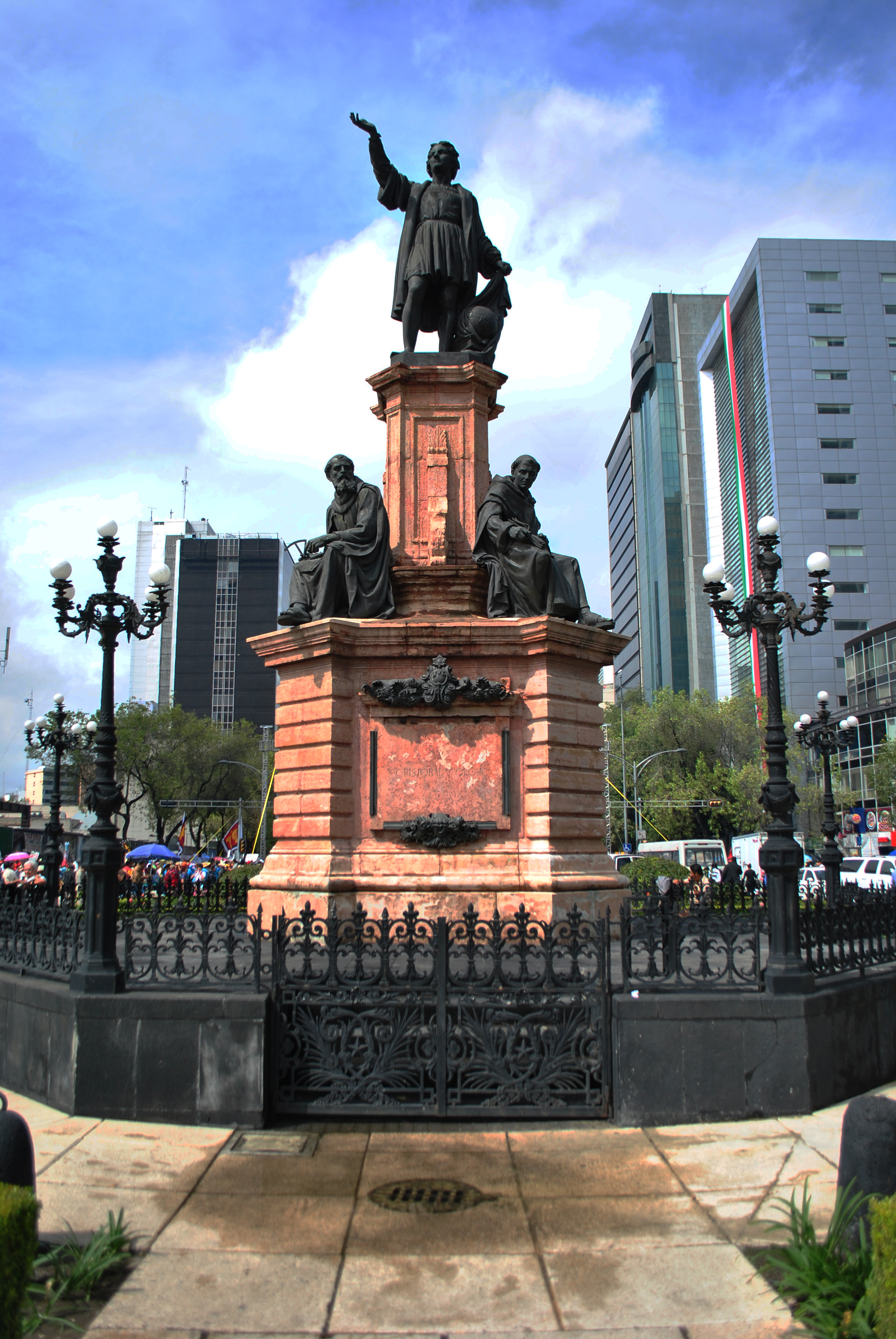
Maximilian planned the monument to Christopher Columbus for the grand boulevard, now called Paseo de la Reforma. It was built during the regime of Porfirio Díaz.

Before 1864, there was no system of banking in Mexico. Religious institutions were a source of credit for elites, usually for landed estates or urban property. During the French Intervention, the branch of a British bank was opened. The London Bank of Mexico and South America Ltd. began operations with a capital of two and a half million pesos. It belonged to the Baring Brothers Group, and had its head office in the corner of the Capuchinas and Lerdo Streets in Downtown Mexico City.

=== Foreign trade ===
At the beginning of the American Civil War, the city of Matamoros was simply a sleepy little border town across the Rio Grande from Brownsville, Texas. It had, for several years, been considered a port, but it had relatively few ships arriving. Previous to the war, accounts mention that not over six ships entered the port each year. In about four years, Matamoros, due to its proximity to Texas, became an active port, and the number of inhabitants increased. A general of the Union Army in 1865 describes the importance of the port in Matamoros:

Matamoros is to the rebellion west of the Mississippi what New York is to the United States—its great commercial and financial center, feeding and clothing the rebellion, arming and equipping, furnishing it materials of war and a specie basis of circulation that has almost displaced Confederate paper...The entire Confederate Government is greatly sustained by resources from this port.

The cotton trade brought together in Bagdad, Tamaulipas and Matamoros over 20,000 speculators from the Union and the Confederacy, England, France, and Germany. Bagdad had grown from a small, seashore town to a "full-pledge town". The English-speaking population in the area by 1864 was so great that Matamoros even had a newspaper printed in English—it was called the Matamoros Morning Call. In addition, the port exported cotton to England and France, where millions of people needed it for their daily livelihood, and it was possible to receive fifty cents per pound in gold for cotton, when it cost about three cents in the Confederacy, "and much more money was received for it laid down in New York and European ports." Other sources mention that the port of Matamoros traded with London, Havana, Belize, and New Orleans. The Matamoros and New York City trade agreement, however, continued throughout the war and until 1864, and it was considered "heavy and profitable".

By 1865, Matamoros was described as a prosperous town of 30,000 people, and Lew Wallace informed General Ulysses S. Grant that neither Baltimore or New Orleans could compare itself to the growing commercial activity of Matamoros. Nevertheless, after the collapse of the Confederacy, "gloom, despondency, and despair" became evident in Matamoros—markets shut down, business almost ceased to exist, and ships were rarely seen. "For Sale" signs began to sprout up everywhere, and Matamoros returned to its role of a sleepy little border town across the Rio Grande.

The conclusion of the American Civil War brought a severe crisis to the now abandoned Port of Bagdad, a crisis that until this day the port has never recovered from. In addition, a tremendous hurricane in 1889 destroyed the desolated port. This same hurricane was one of the many hurricanes during the period of devastating hurricanes of 1870 to 1889, which reduced the population of Matamoros to nearly half its size, mounting with it another upsetting economic downturn.

== Territorial division ==
Departments of the Second Mexican Empire.

Maximilian I wanted to reorganize the territory following scientific criteria, instead of following historical ties, traditional allegiances and the interests of local groups. The task of designing this new division was given to Manuel Orozco y Berra.

This task was realized according to the following criteria:

- The territory should be divided in at least fifty departments,
- Whenever possible, natural boundaries shall be preferred,
- For the territorial extension of each department, the configuration of the terrain, climate and elements of production were taken into consideration so that in due time, they could have a roughly equal number of inhabitants.

On 13 March 1865, the new Law on the territorial division of the Mexican Empire was published. The Empire was divided into 50 departments, though not every department was ever able to be administered due to the ongoing war.

== Legacy ==
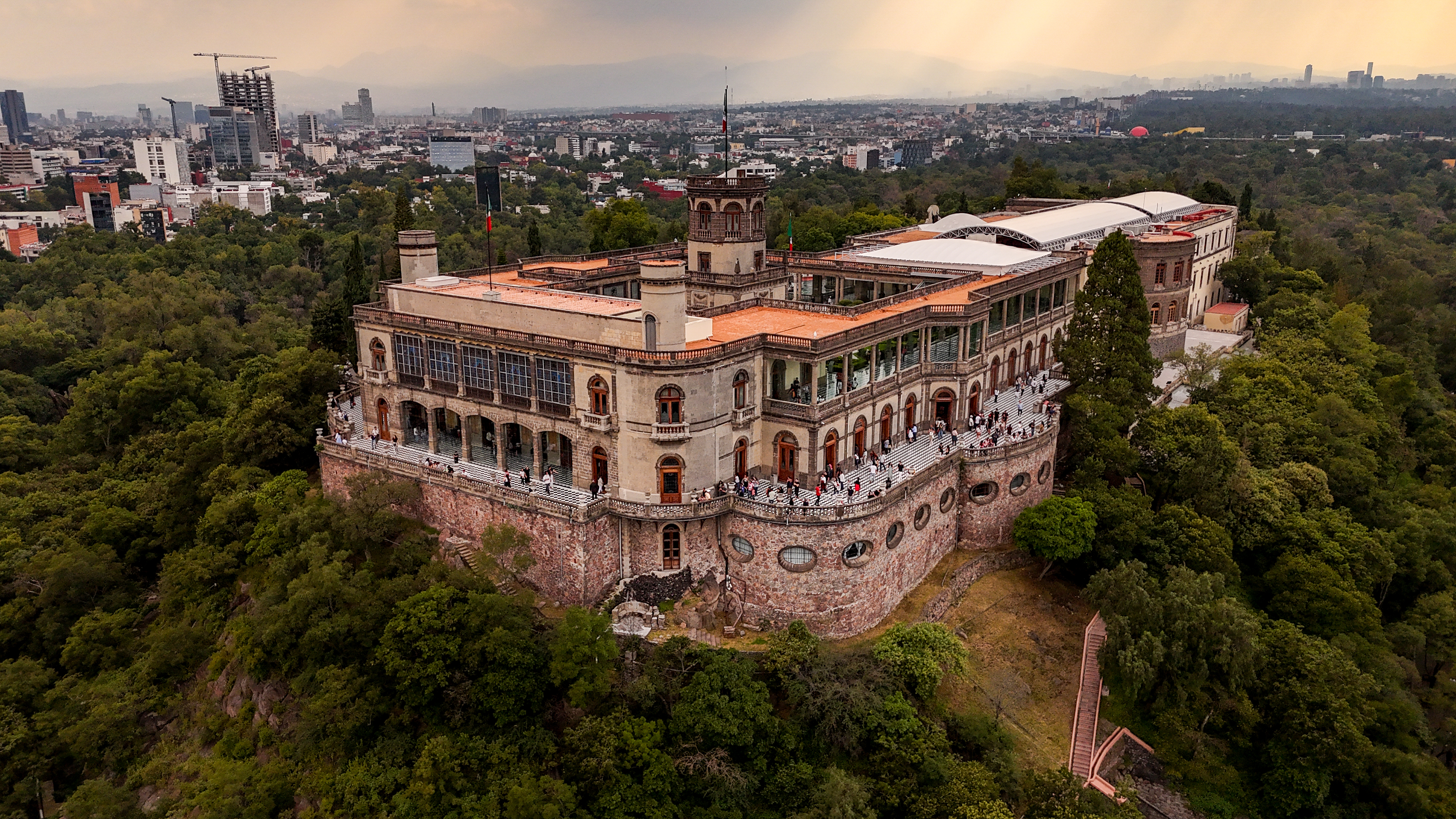
Chapultepec Castle

In spite of the Empire lasting only a few years, the results of Maximilian's construction projects survived him and remain prominent Mexico City landmarks in the present day.

For his royal residence, Maximilian decided to renovate a former viceregal villa in Mexico City, which was also notable for being the site of a battle during the U.S. invasion of Mexico. The result would be Chapultepec Castle, the only castle in North America ever to be used by a monarch. After the fall of the empire, Chapultepec Castle served as the official residence of the Mexican president up until 1940, when it was converted into a museum.

In order to connect the palace to the government offices in Mexico City, Maximilian also built a prominent road which he called Paseo de la Emperatriz (The Empress' Promenade). After the fall of the Empire, the government renamed it Paseo de la Reforma (Promenade of the Reform) to commemorate La Reforma. In the present, it continues to be one of the most prominent avenues of the capital and is lined with civic monuments.

The bolillo, a type of bread widespread in Mexican cuisine, was brought to the country by Maximilian's cooks, and remains another legacy of the Imperial Era.

Today, the Second Mexican Empire is advocated by small far-right groups like the Nationalist Front of Mexico, whose followers believe the Empire to have been a legitimate attempt to deliver Mexico from the hegemony of the United States. They are reported to gather every year at Querétaro, the place where Maximilian and his generals were executed.

== In popular culture ==
The 1970 film Two Mules for Sister Sara was set in Mexico during the years of the Second Mexican Empire. The two main characters, played by Clint Eastwood and Shirley MacLaine, aided a Mexican resistance force and ultimately led them to overpower a French garrison.

The 1969 film The Undefeated starring John Wayne and Rock Hudson portrays events during the French Intervention in Mexico and was also loosely based on the escape of Confederate General Sterling Price to Mexico after the American Civil War and his attempt to join with Maximilian's forces.

The 1965 film Major Dundee starring Charlton Heston and Richard Harris featured Union cavalry (supplemented by Galvanized Yankees) crossing into Mexico and fighting French forces towards the end of the American Civil War.

The 1954 film Vera Cruz was also set in Mexico and has an appearance of Maximilian having a target shooting competition with Gary Cooper and Burt Lancaster's character at Chapultepec Castle. Maximilian was played by George Macready, who at 54 was twenty years older than the Emperor was in 1866.

The 1939 film Juarez featured Paul Muni as Benito Juárez, Bette Davis as Empress Carlota, and Brian Aherne as Emperor Maximilian. It was based, in part, on Bertita Harding's novel The Phantom Crown (1937).

In the Southern Victory Series by Harry Turtledove, Maximilian's Empire survives the turmoil of the 1860s into the 20th century due to the Confederate States emerging victorious in its battle against the United States in the "War of Secession". The sale of the provinces of Sonora and Chihuahua to the Confederate States in 1881 triggers the Second Mexican War, leading the Mexican Empire to fight alongside the Allies during the First and Second Great Wars. The Emperors of Mexico are the fictional descendants of Maximilian I.

The 1990 novel The Difference Engine, co-authored by William Gibson and Bruce Stirling, is set in an alternate 1855 where the timeline diverged in 1824 with Charles Babbage's completion of the difference engine. One consequence is the occupation of Mexico by the Second French Empire with Napoleon III as the de facto emperor instead of the installation of Emperor Maximilian.

In Mexican popular culture, there have been soap operas like "El Carruaje" (1967), plays, films, and historical novels such as Fernando del Paso's Noticias del Imperio (1987). Biographies, memoirs, and novels have been published since the 1860s, and among the most recent have been Prince Michael of Greece's The Empress of Farewells, available in various languages.

== See also ==
- First Mexican Empire
- Second French intervention in Mexico
- Imperial Crown of Mexico
- Emperor of Mexico
- Mexican Imperial Orders
- Nationalist Front of Mexico
- Cabinet of Maximilian I of Mexico
