= Manuel Orozco y Berra =

Mexican historian (1816–1881)

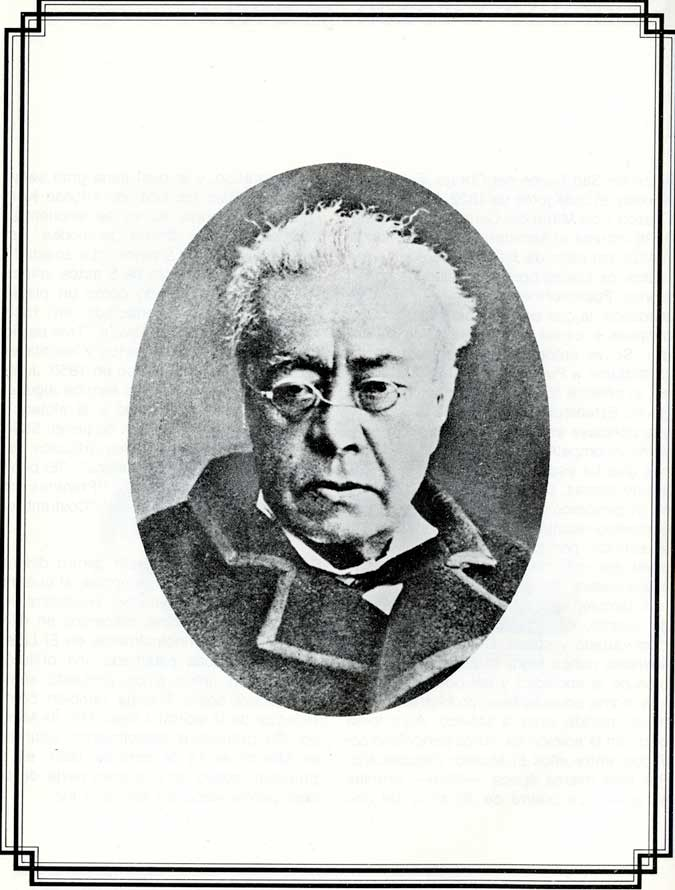
Manuel Orozco y Berra

Manuel Orozco y Berra (8 June 1816 – 27 January 1881; He was born and died in Mexico City) was a Mexican historian and a member of the Mexican Academy of Language. He was a disciple of José Fernando Ramírez and Joaquín García Icazbalceta and together with them, is considered one of the most important historians of Mexico of the 19th century, ranking "as a major figure among 19th-century students of the Mexican Indian past." He produced a significant body of published work on Mesoamerican ethnohistory,

== Career ==
In 1844 he delivered the speech alluding to Independence, publishing various political and literary articles. Three years later he obtained the title of lawyer in the Palafoxiana Seminary of Puebla. In 1850 he was appointed director of the Mexican National Archives. From 1855 to 1857 he served as senior official of the Ministry of Development during the liberal government of Ignacio Comonfort. In 1863 President Benito Juárez appointed him Minister of the Supreme Court of Justice of the Nation. During the French Intervention in Mexico (1864-1867) he served as director of the National Museum under emperor Maximilian I of Mexico. In 1864 his work Geography of languages and ethnographic letter of Mexico was published. His service to Second Mexican Empire resulted in his being tried as a traitor and imprisoned for a period. He returned to public life after his disgrace, and between 1880 and 1881 his masterpiece Ancient History and the Conquest of Mexico was published in four volumes. Orozco y Berra was a pioneer of Mexican historiography and president of the Mexican Society of Geography and Statistics. In 1875 Orozco y Berra was a founding member of the Mexican Academy of Language, he occupied the chair XIII. He was a member of the Natural History Society and an honorary member of the Mining Society. He was a corresponding member of the Spanish Royal Academy and the Royal Academy of History. He was also a member of the Archaeological Society of Santiago de Chile, the Geographical Society of Rome, the Archaeological Society of Paris and the International Congress of Americanists.

He died in Mexico City on January 27, 1881.

== Works ==
- Universal Dictionary of History and Geography (1853-1856), in ten volumes.
- Materials for a Mexican cartography
- Notes on the history of geography in Mexico
- Memory for hydrographic chart of the Valley of Mexico
- Memory for up to Mexico City
- History of geography in Mexico
- Geography of languages and ethnographic letter of Mexico.
- Conquerors of Mexico
- Mexican Studies and Chronology
- Ancient History of the Conquest of Mexico
- History of Spanish rule in Mexico
