= Edward Shawcross =

British historian

Edward Shawcross is a British historian. He studied at Oxford University and University College London, obtaining his PhD from the latter. His research has focused on French imperialism in Latin America and intellectual trends in the Second Mexican Empire. His first book The Last Emperor of Mexico, based on the life of Emperor Maximilian, was well-received in the British press as well as the Wall Street Journal in the U.S. It received praise from among others, British historian of Mexico Matthew Restall, and Martyn Rady, author of The Hapsburgs: To Rule the World. The book was listed in the Sunday Times Best History Books of the Year 2022. The U.S. and U.K. subtitles of The Last Emperor of Mexico differ, with the U.S. edition, published by Basic Books in 2021, subtitled The Dramatic Story of the Habsburg Archduke Who Created a Kingdom in the New World, and the 2022 U.K. edition by Faber & Faber subtitled A Disaster in the New World.

In 2026, Faber & Faber published Shawcross's The People's Emperor: The Unlikely Rise and Spectacular Fall of Napoleon III. In 2026, the publishing house Obroty published a Polish edition of Shawcross's book about Emperor Maximilian entitled Ostatni cesarz Meksyku. Habsburskie królestwo w Nowym Świecie translated by Piotr Chojnacki and Katarzyna Bażyńska-Chojnacka.
