= José Salazar Ilarregui =

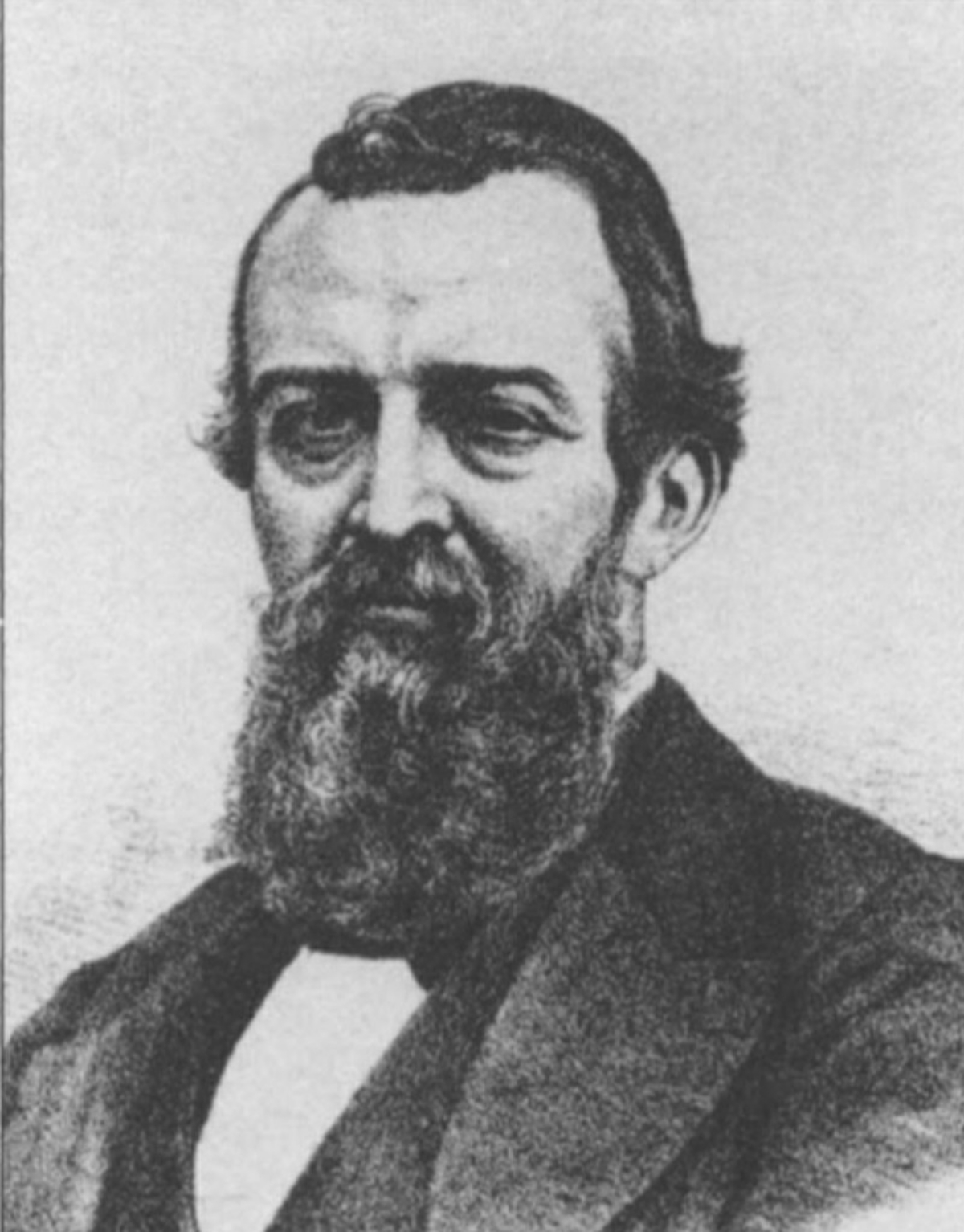

Governor of Yucatan Imperial Commissary of Yucatan
- In office September 4 1864 – March 25 1866
- Preceded by: Felipe Navarrete
- Succeeded by: Domingo Bureau
- In office November 10 1866 – June 15 1867
- Preceded by: Domingo Bureau
- Succeeded by: Manuel Cepeda Peraza

Minister of State
- In office March 8, 1866 – June 15, 1866
- Monarch: Maximilian of Habsburg
- Preceded by: José Fernando Ramírez
- Succeeded by: José María Lacunza

Minister of Development, Colonization, Industry and Commerce
- In office July 26, 1866 – September 14, 1866
- Monarch: Maximilian of Habsburg
- Preceded by: Francisco Somera
- Succeeded by: Joaquín de Mier y Terán
- In office June 13, 1864 – August 21, 1864
- Succeeded by: Manuel Ruiz

Personal details
- Born: September 25, 1823 Mexico City
- Died: May 9, 1892 (aged 68) Mexico City
- Party: Conservative
- Parents: Francisco Salazar Ilarregui (father); Francisca Velázquez y Obregón (mother)

José Salazar Ilarregui (September 25, 1823 – May 9, 1892) was a Mexican politician and statesman. Ilarregui was the Governor of Yucatan during the Second Mexican Empire of Maximilian of Habsburg. He worked in the Mexican Commission of Borders between Mexico-U.S in 1848, and Mexico-Guatemala in 1878-1885.

== Treaty of Limits between Mexico and the United States ==
José Salazar was a surveyor of the Mexican Commission of Borders Matamoros Section of the peace treaty that was signed in the sacristy of the Basilica of Guadalupe in Mexico City on February 2, 1848, and was called Treaty of Peace, Friendship, Limits and Settlement between the United States of America and the Mexican Republic. This document specified the border between the two countries, which included the loss to Mexico of more than half of its territory, which would be added to the United States.

The Mexican Commission of Borders was integrated by:

=== First stage ===
Name	Function
Pedro García Conde	Commissioner
José Salazar Ilarregui	Surveyor
Francisco Jiménez	Engineer First class
Francisco Martínez de Chavero	Secretary of the Commission
Ricardo Ramírez; Agustín García Conde	Engineers Second class
Felipe de Iturbide	Interpreter and translator

=== Second stage ===
Name	Function
Pedro García Conde	Commissioner
José Salazar Ilarregui	Surveyor
Francisco Jiménez; Agustín García Conde	Engineers First class
Francisco Martínez de Chavero	Secretary of the Commission
Ricardo Ramírez; Juan B. Espejo	Engineers Second class
Felipe de Iturbide	Interpreter and translator
Agustín Díaz	Surveyor
Manuel Fernández; Miguel Iglesias; Ignacio Molina; Manuel Alemán; Luis Díaz; Antonio Contreras	Engineers Third class
