= Debbie Shawcross =

British physician and academic

- Education: University College London; St Mary's Hospital Medical School; Imperial College London
- Scientific career
- Workplaces: King's College London
- Thesis: Ammonia, Infection and Inflammation in Hepatic Encephalopathy (2007)

Debbie Lindsay Shawcross is a British physician and clinician who is a professor at King's College London. Her research looks to better understand the cellular and molecular mechanisms that underpin chronic liver disease, with a focus on the gut-liver-brain axis.

== Early life and education ==
Shawcross completed her medical degree at St Mary's Hospital Medical School in 1996. During her undergraduate studies, she spent a year at Imperial College London, where she completed an intercalated degree in physiology and clinical pharmacology. She moved to University College London for her doctoral studies, where she studied hepatic encephalopathy.

== Research and career ==
In 2008, Shawcross was awarded a Higher Education Funding Council for England Clinical Senior Fellowship.

Shawcross investigates chronic liver disease. She is interested in understanding the immune system–gut–liver-brain axis. People who suffer from cirrhosis, a chronic disease of the liver, are likely to develop an infection that results in organ failure. However, little is known about the mechanisms that underpin this disease. Shawcross studies the molecular-level mechanisms that determine whether people cirrhosis suffer from an infection, with a focus on the understanding the behaviour of the gut–brain axis and immune response. The gut-liver-brain axis describes the relationships between the gut, liver and brain. These relationships involve the vagus nerve, the haptic portal vein and the transport of metabolites. Shawcross has shown that people with cirrhosis have dysfunctional gut microbiome (a reduced diversity of species, as well as multi-drug resistant organisms), which can impact their likelihood to suffer from liver disease. Most treatments involve the combination of an antibiotic and a laxative, which impacts the microbiome. Shawcross believes that studying – and learning how to modulate – the gut microbiome offers promise for new treatments. Shawcross showed that bacteriophages could be used to eliminate alcoholic liver disease.

In 2023, Shawcross hosted a pop-up liver clinic for parliamentarians with The British Liver Trust.

== Selected publications ==
- Yi Duan; Cristina Llorente; Sonja Lang; et al. (2019). "Bacteriophage targeting of gut bacterium attenuates alcoholic liver disease". Nature. 575 (7783): 505–511. doi:10.1038/s41586-019-1742-x. PMID 31723265. Wikidata Q91272601.
- Debbie L Shawcross; Nathan A Davies; Roger Williams; Jalan, Rajiv (2004). "Systemic inflammatory response exacerbates the neuropsychological effects of induced hyperammonemia in cirrhosis". Journal of Hepatology. 40 (2): 247–254. doi:10.1016/j.jhep.2003.10.016. PMID 14739095. Wikidata Q51943918.
- Larsen, Fin; Lars Ebbe Schmidt; Bernsmeier, Christine; et al. (2015). "High-volume plasma exchange in patients with acute liver failure: An open randomised controlled trial". Journal of Hepatology. 64 (1): 69–78. doi:10.1016/j.jhep.2015.08.018. PMID 26325537. Wikidata Q41435123.
