= José María Vigil =

Mexican writer, professor, and editor (1829-1909)

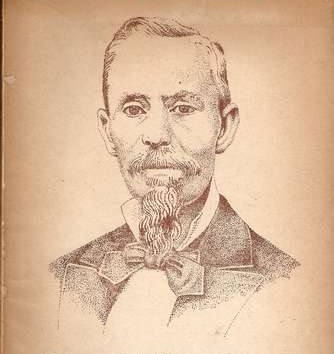
Jose Maria Vigil on a lithograph from 1863.

Jose Maria Vigil (1829 – 18 February 1909) was a Mexican writer. He is known also for establishing a new library and teaching literature, an editor for different newspaper companies, and a professor at different universities. Vigil studied at the Seminary of Guadalajara and studied law at the University of Guadalajara. Before he could complete his studies, he decided to pursue journalism which was his real passion. He was a supporter of the Liberal Party, who he openly supported after the fall of the government of Antonio López de Santa Anna by publishing articles in the newspaper La Esperanza. Around 1855 he taught Latin and philosophy at the University of the State of Jalisco. In 1861 he was senior officer of the Secretary of the Congress, and during his administration he organized the State Public Library.

During the French intervention, he was exiled to the United States and while he was there he published articles supporting the national cause in the newspaper "El Nuevo Mundo." In 1867, with the Republic restored, he returned to Mexico. He taught at the National Preparatory School and at a high school for girls. Vigil edited for the newspaper El Siglo Diez y Nueve. In 1873 he found he Future and in 1878 was an editor at The Monitor Republicano.

He was elected federal deputy to Congress five times. In 1875, with his law experience, he was judge of the Supreme Court of Justice of the Nation. He was director of the Archivo General of the nation. In 1880, he became director of the National Library of Mexico. Vigil did many things for this public library like organizing and classifying a large amount of funds and volumes. Under his leadership, in 1884, he opened the public service in the Hall Mayor and created the Mexican Bibliographic Institute in 1899. In 1882 he published the Philosophical Magazine exposing his ideas against the positivism of Gabino Barreda. Positivism is the view that all truth is from scientific knowledge.

In 1881 he was elected a full member of the Mexican Academy of Language and was the first occupant of the chair. He was appointed librarian in 1883 and director in 1894, he served both positions until the date of his death. He made translations of Persius, Martial, Petrarch, and Ronsard Schiller. He died in Mexico City on 18 February 1909.
