= José Fernando Ramírez =

Mexican historian (1804–1871)

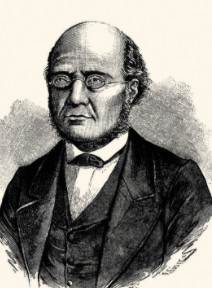
José Fernando Ramírez

José Fernando Ramírez (5 May 1804 – 4 March 1871) was a Mexican historian of the 19th century and Minister of Foreign Affairs in the regime of Emperor Maximilian I of Mexico. He was a mentor of Alfredo Chavero, who considered him "the foremost of our historians."

== Life ==
Ramírez was born in Parral, Chihuahua but grew up in Durango, Durango, where he served as a prominent liberal politician. After graduating with a degree in law from San Luis Gonzaga he was elected several times to the Chamber of Deputies and the Senate. He chaired the Ministry of Foreign affairs under three different administrations and became a minister in the Supreme Court of Justice.

A moderate liberal republican, Ramírez opposed the French invasion of Mexico and establishment of monarchy in 1862, but accepted the position of Minister of Foreign Affairs in the regime of Emperor Maximilian I of Mexico. He was a valuable asset for the emperor, who wished to have a broad appeal to Mexicans.

He paid an emotional goodbye to the emperor. After the fall of the Empire and execution of Maximilian, he went into exile in Europe, since Mexico was no longer considered safe for someone who had served in the imperial government. He died in Bonn, Germany on 4 March 1871.

== Scholar on pre-Columbian history ==
Ramírez's scholarship focused on prehispanic and sixteenth-century Mexican history and excelled as a biographer. During the Second Mexican Empire, he headed the Imperial Academy of Sciences and Literature, directed the National Museum (1852) and built an impressive collection of historical documents. Among his works are one on Toribio de Benavente Motolinia, a Franciscan missionary who was one of the famous Twelve Apostles of Mexico who arrived in New Spain in May 1524, (Note: See Thomas, Prologue, chapter 4 where he names (i) the clerics (including a Franciscan friar) who were present with Hernán Cortés in 1522; (ii) the three Flemish Franciscan lay brothers who came out in 1523 (two of whom died prematurely); and (iii) the "Twelve" (10 Franciscan priests and two Franciscan lay brothers) who came out to New Spain in 1524) and several translations of Aztec codices such as Mapa Quinatzin and Codex Aubin. He was elected a member of the American Antiquarian Society in 1862. A bibliography of his writings on Mesoamerican ethnohistory appears in the Handbook of Middle American Indians published in the 1960s and 1970s.

His achievements as a scholar of Mexican history are untarnished by his political role in the Second Mexican Empire.
