= Third Battle of Puebla =

Battle in the Franco-Mexican war

- Part of Second French intervention in Mexico
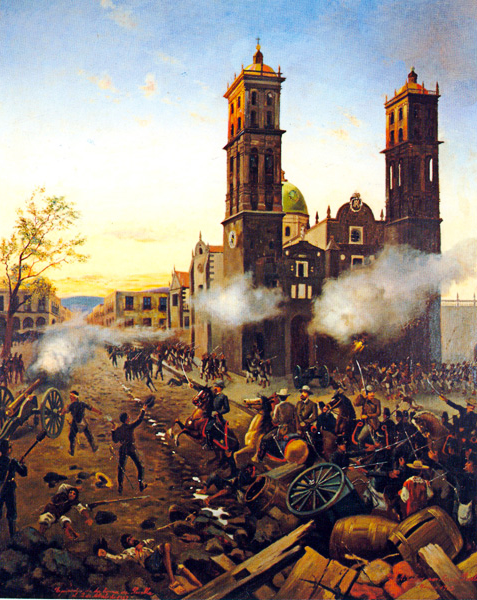
- Episode of the Battle of Puebla, April 2, 1867.
Date	April 2, 1867
Location	Puebla, Puebla, Mexico
Result	Mexican republican victory

Belligerents
(Mexico) Mexican Republicans	(Mexico) Mexican Empire

Commanders and leaders
Porfirio Díaz	Leonardo Márquez

Strength
~ 6,000 soldiers	~ 6,000 soldiers

Casualties and losses
253 killed	2,000 captured (~ 20 shot)

The Battle of 2 de Abril was fought on April 2, 1867, in and around the city of Puebla, Puebla. It was one of the major military actions in the Franco-Mexican War between elements of the Mexican Army of the Republic commanded by General Porfirio Díaz and troops in the service of the Mexican Empire composed of Mexican imperialist soldiers.

The campaign of Puebla includes the siege of Puebla, the battle of April 2, and the capture of the forts of Loreto and Guadalupe. The battle, also known as the Third Battle of Puebla, was the end of a siege on the city of Puebla which started on March 9 of the same year. Despite its being one of the major campaigns in the war of intervention, the number of casualties was low due to the decision of Porfirio Díaz not to execute all the prisoners but instead release most of them under a signed promise that they would not take up arms again against the republic.

The capture of Puebla was a huge defeat for the imperialists and was decisive in the victory of the Republic.

== Background ==
With the republican troops of the Eastern Army under his command, General Porfirio Díaz began the siege of Puebla, capital city of the state of Puebla, on March 9, 1867. Díaz built his headquarters on the hill of San Juan, upon the site of Marshal Elie Frédéric Forey's in the 1863 siege of Puebla.

Díaz did not have enough men and war materials to enact a long-term campaign. The French (who were to definitively leave Mexico on March 11) and imperialist forces occupied an advantageous position, with a similar number of soldiers, more guns, and the forts of Loreto and Guadalupe. In order to lessen the advantage of the besieged, Díaz deployed his soldiers to capture the points that would allow him better control of the land. The Republicans captured the streets of the suburbs one by one, fighting house to house. During this confrontation, General Manuel González was hit by a bullet that shattered his right elbow, necessitating the amputation of that arm.

Then, on March 31, Díaz had an accident that almost cost him his life. The roof of a house collapsed and half-buried him; when the Imperialists realized what had happened, they shot at him through the windows. Finally, Díaz was rescued by Luis Teran.

Leonardo Márquez left Mexico City on March 30 with an army of 3,840 men and 17 artillery pieces. Díaz, knowing that Marquez was going to Puebla, realized he could not keep the site any longer. He had four options: first, to end the siege of Puebla and retreat to the south in order to avoid a joint attack by Marquez and the defenders of the city; second, to abandon the city and attack Marquez before he reached Puebla, facing the possibility of being trapped between far superior forces to his front and rear; third, to leave the city to join in the siege of Querétaro, and face the same possible situation as in the second; finally, to attack and capture Puebla.

== The battle ==
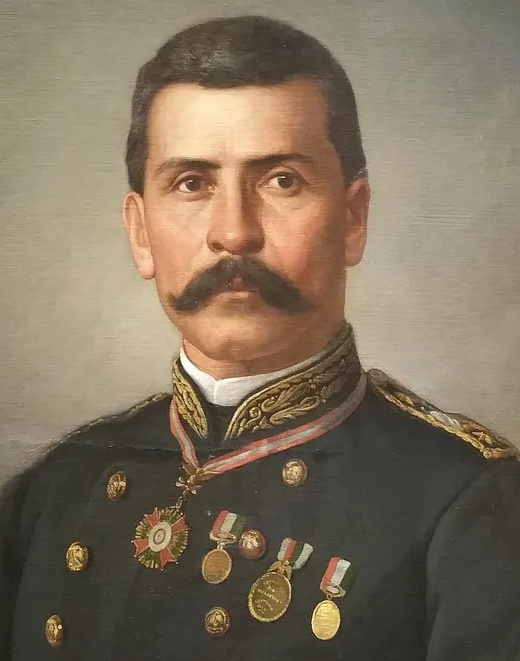
Porfirio Díaz, called for many years "The Hero of 2 de Abril".

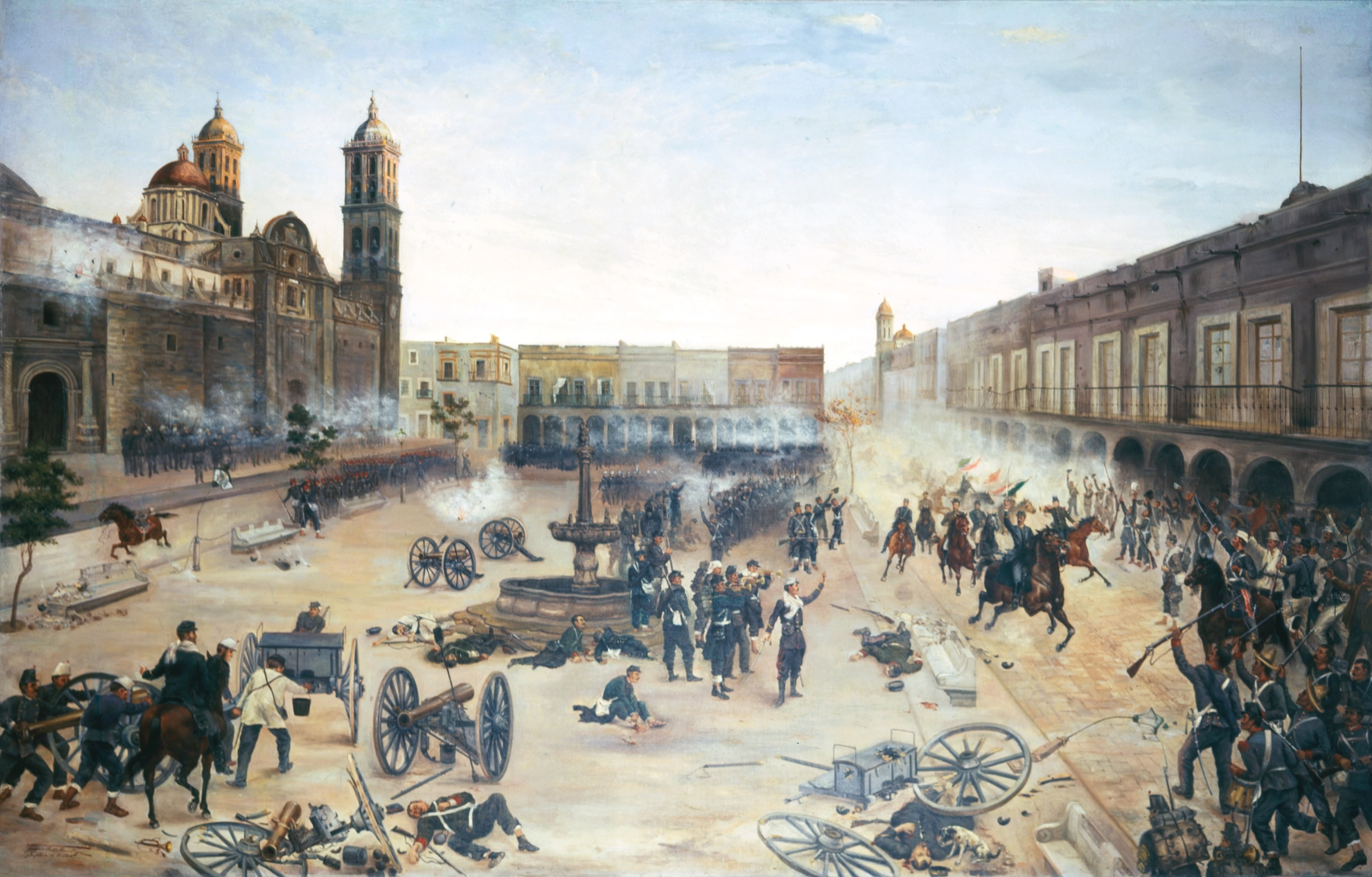
April 2, 1867. Entrance of Porfirio Díaz to Puebla., oil on canvas by Francisco de Paula Mendoza, 1902.

On April 1, Díaz and his staff decided to attack Puebla. Díaz divided his army into 17 columns of assault; three columns would feign an attack on the convent of Carmen, with the intention of diverting imperialist forces from the place by which he intended to enter the city.

Following the plan, the attack began at 2:45 a.m. April 2. Major Carlos Pacheco commanded the column of assault that captured one of the entrances to the city. Pacheco was severely injured and lost an arm and a leg, but survived. The attack ended at 6 a.m.

Besides the city, the Republican army captured plenty of artillery and bullets. In accordance with military law, Díaz ordered the execution of Febronio Quijano, Mariano Trujeque, and 20 other commanders and officers taken prisoner.

On April 4, the forts of Loreto and Guadalupe surrendered. Unlike at Puebla, Díaz forgave all the officers taken prisoner in the hills of Loreto and Guadalupe. He declared later:"The executions (at Puebla) caused me a painful impression, and since then I decided to stop them..." The decision of Díaz caused him great problems with Benito Juárez, with whom he had an acrimonious relationship despite his victories for the Republican cause.

== Aftermath ==
After the capture of Puebla, Porfirio Díaz went out to meet Leonardo Marquez who was going to Puebla. When Marquez learned of the fall of Puebla, he decided to retire, but Díaz reached him in the Hacienda de San Lorenzo; Marquez avoided the fight and fled, but General Amado Guadarrama captured 44 Mexican imperialist soldiers and 99 Austrians, 49 carts of bullets, and the military equipment of his troop. Although Díaz also sent a group of soldiers after Marquez, he finally reached Mexico City, which was still under the control of the empire.

The victory of April 2 allowed the forces of the Republic to move toward Querétaro and Mexico City. Mexico City was finally taken by Porfirio Díaz without the firing of a single bullet.

== See also ==
- Battle of Puebla
- Second French intervention in Mexico
- History of Mexico

== Bibliography ==
- Fuentes Aguirre, Armando (2006). Juárez y Maximiliano. La Roca y el Ensueño (in Spanish). Diana. p. 714. ISBN 978-968-13-4266-1.
- Godoy, Jose F. (1910). EL FUNDADOR DE UNA GRAN REPÚBLICA (in Spanish). Muller Hnos. p. 284.
- Zárate, Julio (1880). "La Reforma". In Vicente Riva Palacio (ed.). México a través de los siglos (in Spanish). Vol. V. México: Ballescá y compañía.
