= Delfina Ortega Díaz =

First Lady of Mexico (1845-1880)

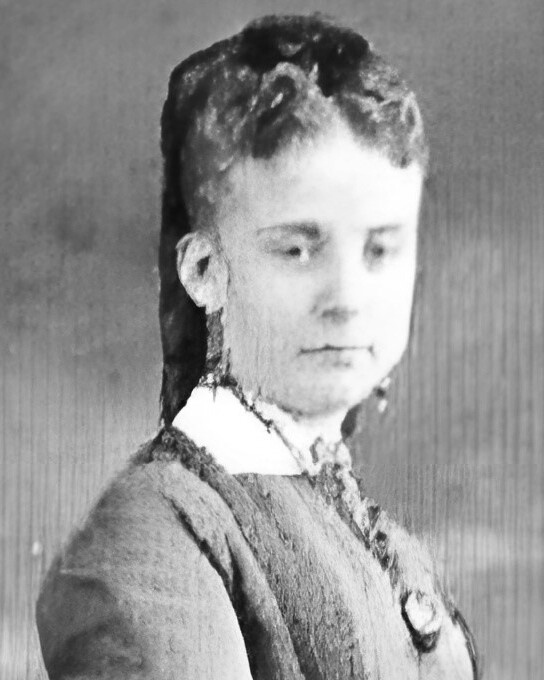

First Lady of Mexico
- In role 17 February 1867 – 8 April 1880
- President: Porfirio Díaz

Personal details
- Born: October 20, 1845 Solar del Toronjo, Oaxaca City, Mexico
- Died: April 8, 1880 (aged 34) Calle de la Moneda, 1, Mexico City, Mexico
- Spouse: Porfirio Díaz (m. 1867)
- Children: 8, with only 2 surviving
- Parent(s): Manuel Antonio Ortega Reyes; Victoria Manuela Díaz Mori

Delfina Ortega Díaz (October 20, 1845 – April 8, 1880) was the first lady of Mexico, as Porfirio Díaz's niece and first wife. She married him in 1867. They had eight children, of which two survived, Porfirio Díaz Ortega and Luz Victoria Díaz Ortega.

She died in 1880 from complications of childbirth and was survived by Porfirio.
