= Porfirionism =

Mexican political ideology

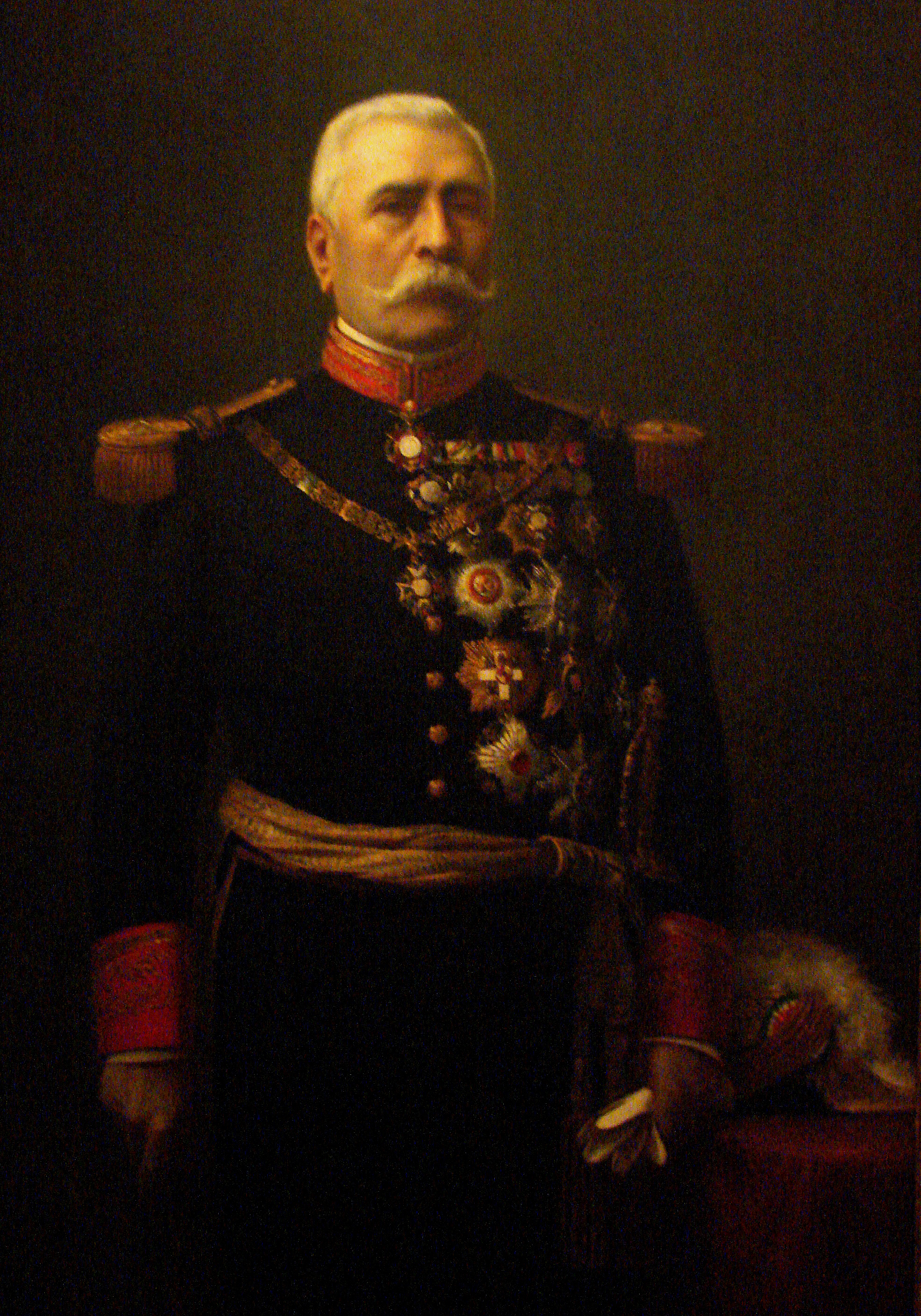
General Porfirio Díaz

Porfirionism or Porfirismo (Spanish: Porfirismo) is an authoritarian and personalistic political ideology rooted and developed during the dictatorship of Mexican general Porfirio Díaz in which it ushered a period of right-wing and far-right politics to Mexico. Porifirionism is characterized by its conservatism, militarism, and nationalism. Under Díaz, the country experienced a long-lasting peace called "Pax Porfiriana" often due to its militarization of the rurales and elimination of political opponents which helped achieve foreign investments into the country, rapid industrialization, militarization, and modernization of social culture adopting the phrase "Order and Progress" to achieve these ideals at all costs.

== History ==
=== Political order ===
Starting with Díaz's second term (1884–1888), following the interregnum of President González, the regime has been characterized as a dictatorship, with no opponents of Díaz elected to Congress and Díaz staying in office with undemocratic elections. Congress was Díaz's rubber stamp for legislation. Internal stability, sometimes called the Pax Porfiriana, was coupled with the increasing strength of the Mexican state, fueled by increased revenues from an expanding economy. Díaz replaced several independent regional leaders with men loyal to himself and quelled discontent by coopting political "outs" by making them intermediaries with foreign investors, allowing their enrichment. To further consolidate state power, Díaz appointed jefes políticos ("political bosses") answerable to the central government, who commanded local forces. The policies of conciliation, cooptation, and repression allowed the regime to maintain order for decades. In central Mexico, Indigenous communities that had exercised political and economic control over their lands and populations were undermined by the Díaz regime through the expropriation of lands and the weakening or absence of Indigenous leadership. Expropriation of village lands occurred as landed estates (haciendas), often owned by foreign investors, expanded. Díaz used coercion to repress democratic power, using the pan o palo or "bread or bludgeon" policy. This allowed him to appoint state governors who could do what they wanted to local populations, so long as they did not interfere with Díaz's operations. This process is known for the state of Morelos before the Mexican Revolution when Emiliano Zapata emerged as a leader in Anenecuilco to defend village lands and rights. Since the Díaz regime aimed to reconcile foreign investors and large estate owners, foreign and domestic, indigenous villages suffered politically and economically.

When Díaz came to power in 1876, the northern border of Mexico with the US became a region of tension and conflict, which had to be resolved for Díaz's regime to be recognized as the sovereign government of Mexico. Indigenous groups and cattle thieves marauded in the border region. The Apache did not recognize the sovereignty of either the US or Mexico over their territories, but used the international division to their advantage, raiding on one side of the border and seeking sanctuary on the other. Thieves stole cattle and likewise used the border to escape authorities. The US used the border issue as a reason to withhold recognition of Díaz's regime and a low-level international conflict continued. The issue of recognition was finally resolved when Díaz's government granted generous concessions to prominent US promoters of investment in Mexico, who pressured President Rutherford B. Hayes to grant recognition in 1878. It was clear to Díaz that order was to be maintained over all other considerations.

The turmoil of over a decade of war (1857–1867) and economic disruption gave rise to banditry. To combat this, during the administration of civilian president Benito Juárez, a small, efficient rural police force under his control, known as the rurales, was a tool to impose order. When Díaz became president, he expanded the size and scope of the rurales; they were under his command and control in a way the Mexican army was not. The slogan of the Porfiriato, "order and progress," affirmed that without political order, economic development and growth—progress—was impossible. Investors would be unwilling to risk their capital if political conditions were unstable.

The construction of railways gave the government more effective control of many regions of Mexico that had maintained a level of independence due to their distance from the capital. The construction of telegraph lines alongside railroad tracks further facilitated the government's control, so that orders from Mexico City were instantly transmitted to officials elsewhere. The government could respond quickly to regional revolts by loading armed rurales and their horses on trains to quell disturbances. By the end of the 19th century, violence had almost completely disappeared.

== Social ideals ==
The societal ideals during Díaz's presidency can be linked to the phrase "Order and Progress", the progress aspect of the phrase is attributed to the adoption of a new social concept of masculinity and also the establishment of new class distinctions.

== Neoporfirionism ==
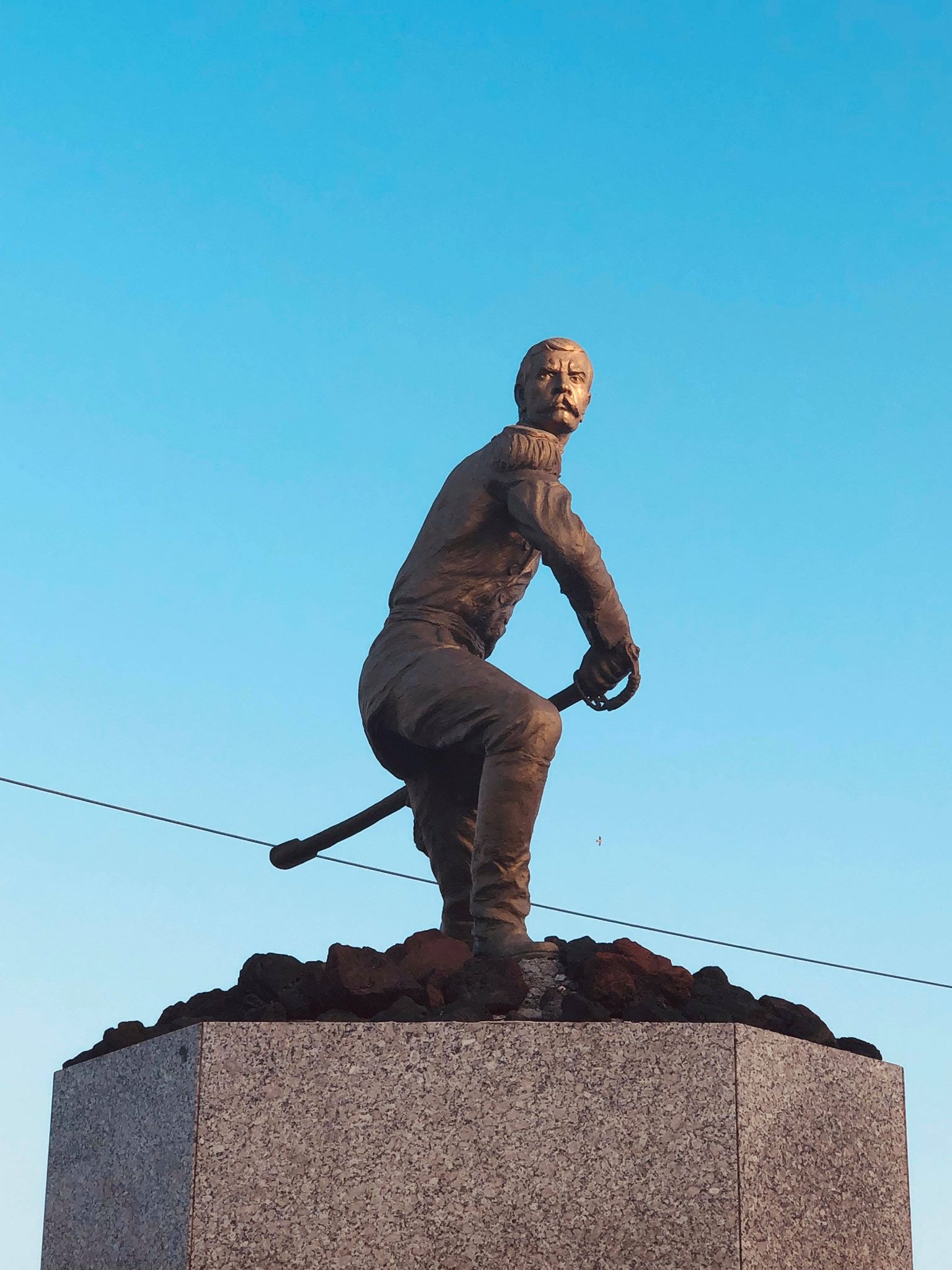
Statue of Porfirio Díaz in the city of Matamoros.

Porfirionism and its legacy are still debated in Mexican society. President Andres Manuel Lopez Obrador published a book titled "Neoporfirismo: Hoy como ayer" in which he states that Díaz's policies never went away after the Mexican Revolution but adapted and were implemented in the Institutional Revolutionary Party (PRI) following the acquisitions of neoliberal stances in the 1980s. he also draws a comparison between the PRI One-Party rule and the National Action Party administration of the 2000s as the form of a "Neoporfiriato".

== See also ==
- Porfirio Díaz
- Porfiriato
- Revolutionary Mexicanist Action
- Pinochetism
- Caudillo
- Francoism
