= Porfirio Díaz =

President of Mexico from 1876 to 1911

The Most Excellent Porfirio Díaz
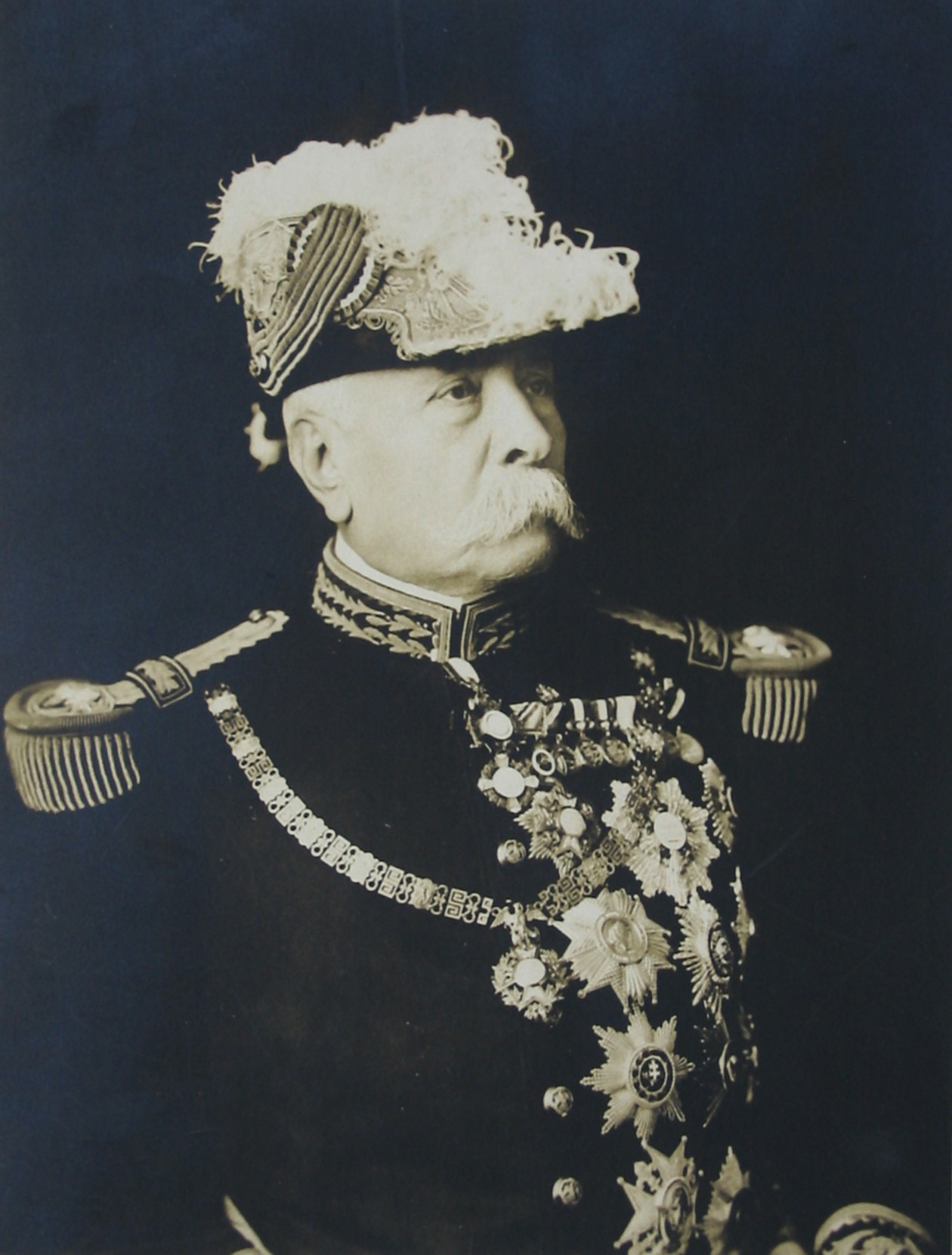
- Díaz in 1910

33rd President of Mexico
- In office 1 December 1884 – 25 May 1911
- Vice President: None (1884–1904); Ramón Corral (1904–1911, position reestablished) (Note: Valentín Gómez Farías was serving as both President and Vice President in 1847 when he was ousted by Antonio López de Santa Anna. The office was then abolished by a constitutional amendment and was not restored with the adoption of the Constitution of 1857. Subsequent administrations, still under this constitution, continued to lack a vice presidential position, until the Porfiriato. By 1904, Díaz was over 70 years old, and fear grew of political instability should he die in office without a clear successor. In response, Díaz ran in the 1904 election with Corral as running mate, winning.)
- Preceded by: Manuel González Flores
- Succeeded by: Francisco León de la Barra
- In office 17 February 1877 – 1 December 1880
- Preceded by: Juan N. Méndez
- Succeeded by: Manuel González Flores
- In office 28 November – 6 December 1876
- Preceded by: José María Iglesias
- Succeeded by: Juan N. Méndez

Governor of Oaxaca
- In office 1 December 1882 – 3 January 1883
- Preceded by: José Mariano Jiménez
- Succeeded by: José Mariano Jiménez

Secretary of Development, Colonization and Industry of Mexico
- In office 1 December 1880 – 27 June 1881
- President: Manuel González Flores
- Preceded by: Vicente Riva Palacio
- Succeeded by: Carlos Pacheco Villalobos

Governor of the Federal District
- In office 15 June 1867 – 14 August 1867
- Preceded by: Tomas O'Horan
- Succeeded by: Juan José Baz

Personal details
- Born: José de la Cruz Porfirio Díaz Mori c. 15 September 1830 (baptized) Oaxaca de Juárez, Oaxaca, Mexico
- Died: 2 July 1915 (aged 84) Paris, France
- Resting place: Cimetière du Montparnasse, Paris
- Party: Liberal Party
- Spouses: Delfina Ortega Díaz (m. 1867; died 1880) Carmen Romero Rubio (m. 1881)
- Children: 8
- Profession: Military officer, politician

Military service
- Allegiance: Mexico
- Branch/service: Mexican Army
- Years of service: 1848–1876
- Rank: General
- Battles/wars: Mexican-American War; Revolution of Ayutla; Reform War; Battle of Calpulalpan; Second Franco-Mexican War; Battle of Las Cumbres; Battle of Puebla; Second Battle of Puebla; Siege of Oaxaca; Battle of San Juan Bautista; Battle of Miahuatlán; Battle of La Carbonera; Third Battle of Puebla; Battle of San Lorenzo Hills; Siege of Mexico City; Plan de la Noria; Battle of San Mateo; Tuxtepec Revolution; Battle of Tecoac
- Díaz's voice Porfirio Díaz's message to Thomas Edison; Recorded 1909

José de la Cruz Porfirio Díaz Mori (Note: In this Mexican name, the surname is Díaz and the second or maternal family name is Mori.) (/ˈdiːəs/; Spanish: [poɾˈfiɾjo ˈði.as]; baptized 15 September 1830 – 2 July 1915), commonly known as Porfirio Díaz, was a Mexican army general and politician who was the leader of Mexico from 1876, and the actual dictator after 1886 until his overthrow in 1911. Seizing power in a military coup, he served on three occasions as president of Mexico, a total of over thirty years, the longest of any Mexican ruler. This period is known as the Porfiriato and has been called a de facto dictatorship.

Díaz was born to a Oaxacan family of modest means. He initially studied to become a priest but eventually switched his studies to law, and among his mentors was the future President of Mexico, Benito Juárez. Díaz increasingly became active in Liberal Party politics fighting with the Liberals to overthrow Santa Anna in the Plan of Ayutla, and also fighting on their side against the Conservative Party in the Reform War.

During the second French intervention in Mexico, Díaz fought in the Battle of Puebla in 1862, which temporarily repulsed the invaders, but was captured when the French besieged the city with reinforcements a year later. He escaped captivity and made his way to Oaxaca de Juárez, becoming political and military commander over all of Southern Mexico, and successfully resisting French efforts to advance upon the region, until Oaxaca City fell before a French siege in 1865. Díaz once more escaped captivity seven months later and rejoined the army of the Mexican Republic as the Second Mexican Empire disintegrated in the wake of the French departure. As Emperor Maximilian made a last stand in Querétaro, Díaz was in command of the forces that took back Mexico City in June 1867.

During the era of the Restored Republic, he subsequently revolted against presidents Benito Juárez and Sebastián Lerdo de Tejada on the principle of no re-election. Díaz succeeded in seizing power, ousting Lerdo in a coup in 1876, with the help of his political supporters, and was elected in 1877. In 1880, he stepped down and his political ally Manuel González was elected president, serving from 1880 to 1884. In 1884, Díaz abandoned the idea of no re-election and held office continuously until 1911.

A controversial figure in Mexican history, Díaz's regime ended political instability and achieved growth after decades of economic stagnation. He and his allies comprised a group of technocrats known as científicos ("scientists"), whose economic policies benefited a circle of allies and foreign investors, helping hacendados consolidate large estates, often through violent means and legal abuse. These policies grew increasingly unpopular, resulting in civil repression and regional conflicts, as well as strikes and uprisings from labor and the peasantry, groups that did not share in Mexico's growth.

Despite public statements in 1908 favoring a return to democracy and not running again for office, Díaz reversed himself and ran in the 1910 election. Díaz, then 80 years old, failed to institutionalize presidential succession, triggering a political crisis between the científicos and the followers of General Bernardo Reyes, allied with the military and peripheral regions of Mexico. After Díaz declared himself the winner for an eighth term, his electoral opponent, wealthy estate owner Francisco I. Madero, issued the Plan of San Luis Potosí calling for armed rebellion against Díaz, leading to the outbreak of the Mexican Revolution. In May 1911, after the Federal Army suffered several defeats against the forces supporting Madero, Díaz resigned in the Treaty of Ciudad Juárez and went into exile in Paris, where he died four years later.

== Early years ==
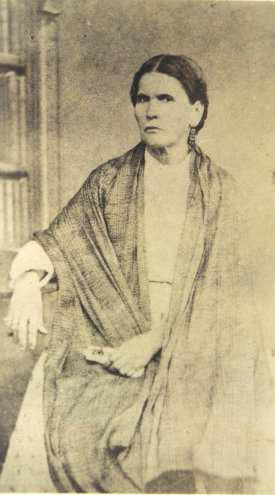
María Petrona Cecilia Mori Cortés, mother of Porfirio Díaz, photo c. 1854 in Oaxaca

Porfirio Díaz was the sixth of seven children, baptized on 15 September 1830, in the city of Oaxaca de Juárez, Mexico, in the state of Oaxaca but his exact date of birth is unknown. 15 September is an important date in Mexican history, the eve of Miguel Hidalgo's Grito de Dolores, which triggered the Mexican War of Independence in 1810. After Díaz became president, it would become customary to commemorate the Grito de Dolores on the eve of its anniversary.

Díaz's father, José Faustino Díaz Orozco, was a Criollo (a Mexican of predominantly Spanish ancestry). José Díaz was an illiterate dependiente, or workman employed by a firm of merchants. In 1808, he had married María Petrona Cecilia Mori Cortés, whose mother was Mixtec, and whose father could trace his ancestry from Asturias.

Eventually, José de la Cruz had saved enough to start planting agave, and he opened a wayside inn in Oaxaca City to sell the products of his business. José de la Cruz died in 1833 of cholera when Díaz was only three years old. Petrona Mori began to manage the inn while raising her multiple children.

=== Education ===
The young Díaz was sent to primary school at the age of 6 and at one point was apprenticed to a carpenter. In 1845, at the age of fifteen, Díaz entered the Colegio Seminario Conciliar de Oaxaca, to study for the priesthood, sponsored by his godfather, José Agustín Domínguez, canon of and eventually Bishop of Oaxaca.

In 1846, the Mexican-American War broke out, and Díaz joined a Oaxacan military battalion. He practiced drills and attended lectures on tactics and strategy at the Institute of Arts and Sciences, but he never saw combat by the time the war ended in 1848.

By 1849, Díaz decided that he did not have a vocation to the priesthood and over the objections of his family decided to switch his studies to law. He gained the friendship of Don Marcos Pérez and Indigenous judge and professor of law at the Institute of Arts and Sciences through which Díaz also came to know his future colleague and president of Mexico, Benito Juárez who was at that time Governor of Oaxaca. Díaz passed his first examination in civil and canon law in 1853, at the age of 23.

=== Plan of Ayutla ===
In that same year however, a Conservative Party coup overthrew the Liberal government of Mariano Arista and raised Santa Anna for what would turn out to be his final dictatorship. Many prominent Liberals were expelled from the country, including Benito Juárez who found refuge in New Orleans. Don Marcos Pérez was arrested, but Díaz was able to communicate with him in prison with the help of Díaz's brother Félix.

In March 1854 the Plan of Ayutla broke out against Santa Anna led by the Liberal caudillo Juan Álvarez. After openly expressing support for Álvarez, Díaz was forced to flee Oaxaca and joined up with the Liberal partisan, Francisco Herrera. Authorities managed to attack and disperse Herrera's troops, and Díaz once more had to flee, but the Ayutla movement was increasingly growing in strength. When the Liberals captured the city of Oaxaca, Díaz was made subprefect of Ixtlan. As sub-prefect Díaz helped in an ill-fated effort to put down a barracks revolt in Oaxaca, but the Ayutla movement ultimately triumphed by August 1855, when Santa Anna resigned, subsequently fleeing the nation.

== Reform War ==
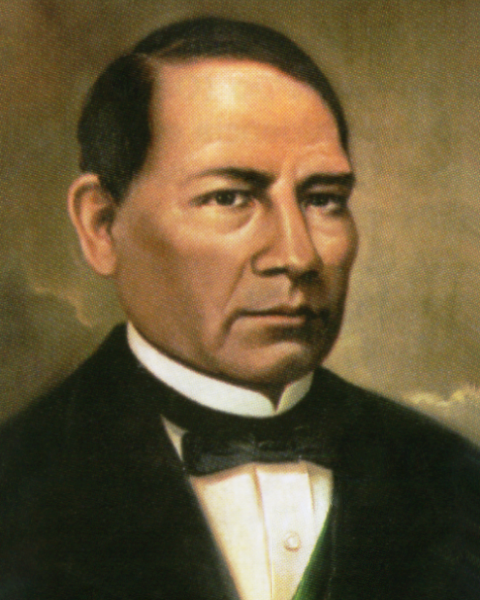
Díaz's former law professor, Benito Juárez became president at the start of the Reform War

Juan Álvarez was elected president in October 1855 and his administration inaugurated what would come to be known as La Reforma an unprecedented attempt to pass through progressive constitutional reforms for Mexico culminating in the promulgation of the Constitution of 1857. Conservative Party resistance ended up triggering the outbreak of the Reform War in late 1857, at the same time when Díaz's old mentor, Benito Juarez became president. The Conservatives set up their rival government in opposition to Juarez and the Liberals.

Díaz at this time was still in Oaxaca. He had previously accepted a commission as captain in the National Guard in December 1856. As the Reform War broke out, he maintained his command in Ixtlan, until the Conservative General Marcelino Cobos defeated the Liberal forces in Oaxaca in January 1858. Díaz was shot in the leg and would not recover for four months.

Díaz rejoined the war and was present when Cobos was defeated in Xalapa in February 1858. Diaz was subsequently named Governor and Military Commandant of the district of Tehuantepec. He was given command over 150 men and tasked with raising funds and receiving arms imported from the United States. Díaz chose the coast town of Juchitán de Zaragoza as his headquarters and exercised his command for two years. For winning repeated victories against the Conservatives he was promoted to the rank of lieutenant colonel.

At the beginning of 1860, Díaz went to the aid of the Liberal general José María Díaz Ordaz in defending Oaxaca City against Cobos. The latter fell upon Díaz at Mitla on 20 January and defeated him, but Cobos retreated as Ordaz arrived with reinforcements, only for Ordaz to lose his life in the effort. His command over the forces of Oaxaca was passed down to Cristóbal Salinas. Díaz's old mentor Marcos Perez fell into a quarrel with Salinas over his strategy, and Díaz failed to mediate. Juarez replaced Salinas with Vicente Rosas Landa, but the Liberals in Oaxaca were defeated at the hands of Cobos in November 1859. Díaz and Salinas found refuge in the mountains of Ixtlan.

While the fortune of the Liberals appeared to be at a low ebb at Oaxaca, the Conservatives as a whole at this point, were losing the war throughout the entire country, rapidly being drained of funds and resources. This helped Díaz and Salinas take back Oaxaca City by August 1860. Díaz was promoted to colonel and transferred from the National Guard to the regular army. He was present at the decisive Battle of Calpulalpan, which decisively ended the war in favor of the Liberals.

The victorious President Juarez reentered the capital in January 1861. Díaz also joined the national congress as a deputy from Ocotlan. The Conservative government had ceased to operate and its president, Miguel Miramon had fled the nation, but Conservative guerillas were still active in the countryside. In June 1861, the Conservative General Leonardo Márquez made a raid upon the capital and Díaz left his congressional seat to join Ignacio Mejía and Jesús González Ortega in once more defending the city. At Xalatlaco, Díaz without waiting for orders fell upon the forces of Marquez and won a notable victory. The Conservative forces were scattered and fled into the hills.

== Second French Intervention in Mexico ==
=== Battle of Puebla ===
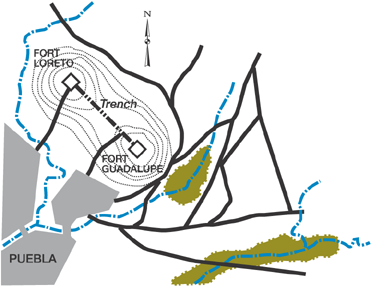
The terrain at the Battle of Puebla (1862). Díaz and his troops were located south, guarding a road leading into the city.

At the opening of the Second French Intervention, in which France would attempt to overthrow the Mexican Republic and replace it with a client monarchy, Díaz had advanced to the rank of general and was in command of an infantry brigade. He was present at the first engagement of the war when he lost three-fourths of his men after the French attacked his brigade in the state of Veracruz. He retreated and joined up with the forces of Ignacio Zaragoza to continue harassing the enemy in the vicinity of Orizaba. Díaz and Zaragoza were forced to retreat before ending up in the city of Puebla by 3 May.

On the morning of 5 May, Díaz was in command of the Oaxaca battalion, guarding one of the roads leading into Puebla. Commander of the French forces, Charles de Lorencez ordered his troops to ascend a hill overlooking the town for a direct attack upon the forts of Loreto and Guadalupe. The ascent failed, and the French were repulsed by attacks of Mexican cavalry and infantry. During the battle, Díaz was not present at the hill but rather on the plains to the right of the Mexican front, where he repulsed another French attack, causing a large number of casualties to the enemy. General Díaz pursued the French on their retreat to the Hacienda San Jose Renteria until recalled by Zaragoza.

The French attributed their defeat at Puebla to a lack of Conservative Party support. The Mexican monarchist expatriates who had given the idea of a Mexican monarchy to Napoleon III had also been working independently of any Mexican authority or political party. When the French invaders arrived in Mexico they found the Conservatives reluctant to help the French in establishing a monarchy and proclaiming their loyalty to the type of centralist republic they had once established in Mexico. However, the Conservatives were increasingly won over to collaborate with the French as a means of receiving the military aid that would return them to power. Díaz would once again have to fight many of the men he once faced in the Reform War such as Leonardo Márquez and the ex-Conservative president Miguel Miramon. Eventually, Porfirio Díaz as well would be personally asked to join the French, an offer which he would refuse.

=== Second Battle of Puebla ===
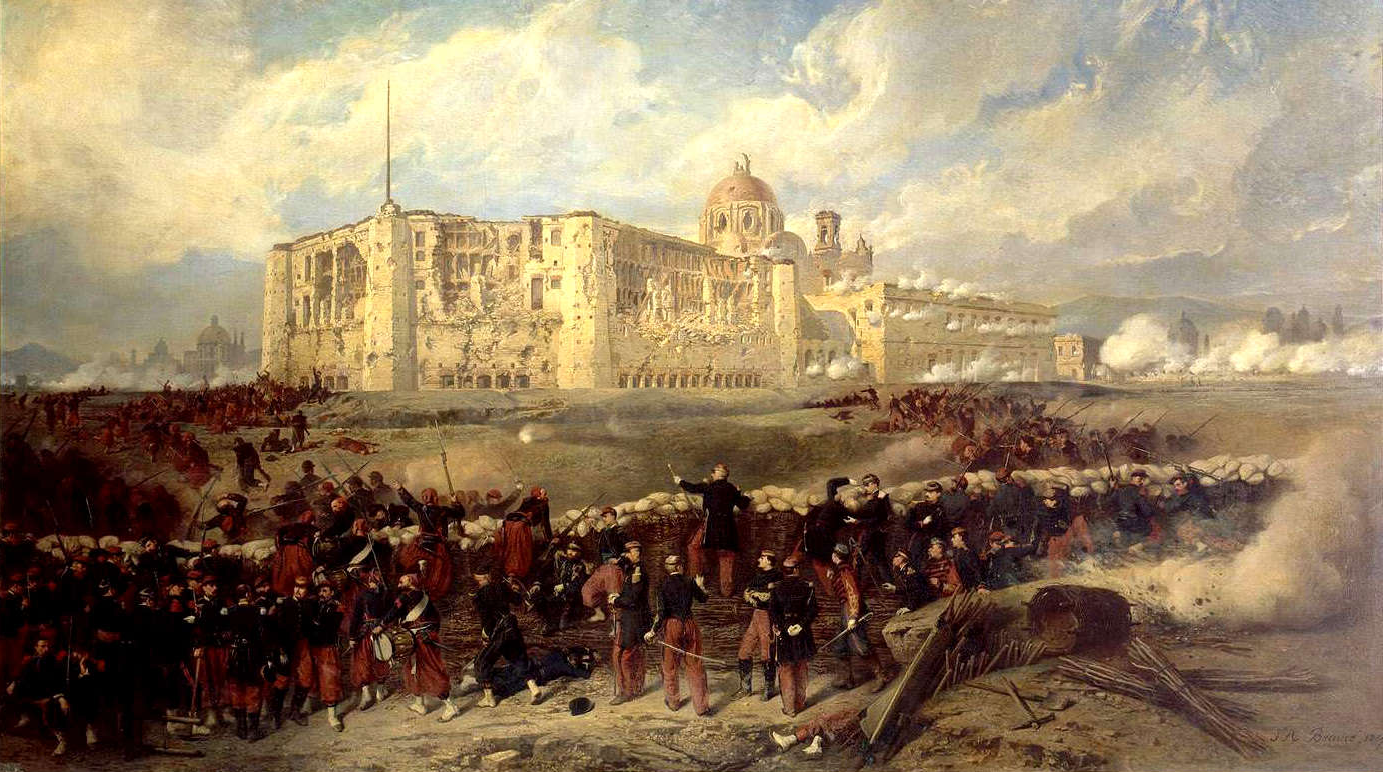
The Second Battle of Puebla in which the French stormed the city, and General Díaz was forced to engage against them in urban warfare

The French loss at the Battle of Puebla delayed the French march into the interior of Mexico by a year while Lorencez awaited reinforcements from France. Meanwhile, Díaz had been made military governor of the Veracruz district. Soon after the Battle of Puebla, General Zaragoza died of typhus and was replaced in his command by Jesús González Ortega.

A second French siege of Puebla was this time led by Élie Frédéric Forey with 26,000 men, against the 20,000 troops commanded by Ortega. The Mexican defenders would hold out for two months from 16 March to 17 May in 1863, until they ran out of provisions. Against the advice of Díaz who suggested an offense, Ortega simply maintained a policy of defense, until the city was stormed.

As street fighting broke out at the beginning of April, Díaz was in command of the most exposed quarter of the city made up of seventeen blocks, and he made his headquarters at the strongest point of the district which was a large building known as the meson de San Marcos. As Díaz planned his defenses, the French advanced with artillery and cannonballs began to crash through the building.

As French zouaves poured through the breaches, they were repulsed every time, and by the evening Díaz had regained complete control over his headquarters. Similar scenes occurred throughout the city and by April 25, Forey was contemplating suspending military operations until larger siege guns could arrive. Despite the ongoing stalemate, the French were reassured by the knowledge that the Mexicans were running out of food and supplies.

=== First escape ===
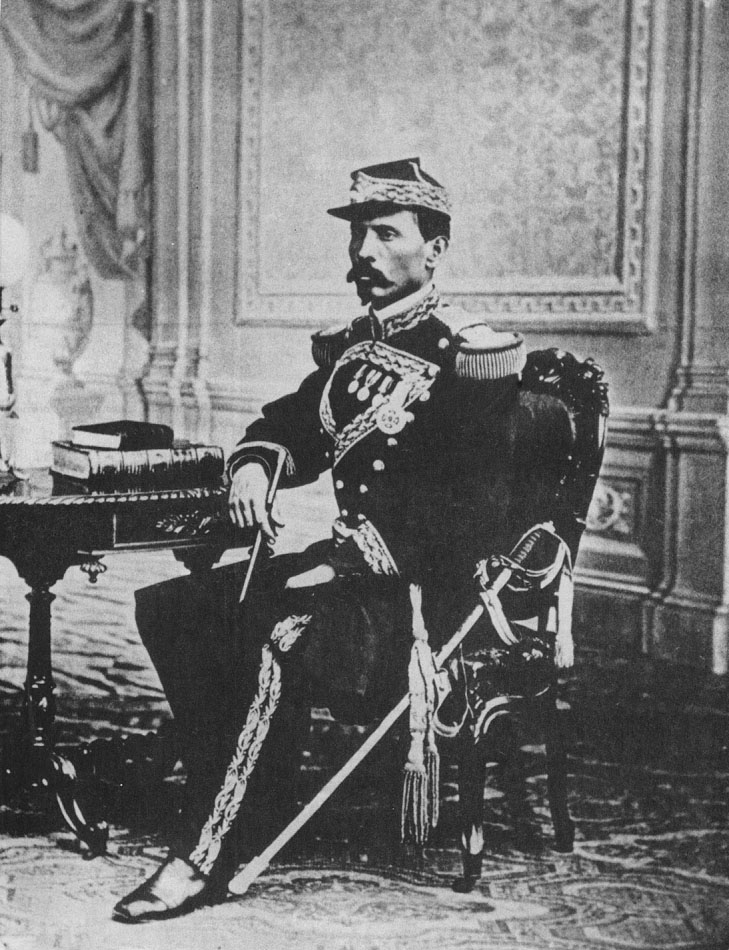
A young Porfirio Díaz, at the time of the Intervention

Díaz, among other officers, managed to escape before even arriving in Veracruz. Díaz then headed for Mexico City to report to President Benito Juárez. The president prepared to depart Mexico City and commissioned Díaz to raise troops for the military district of Queretaro.

After capturing Mexico City in June 1863, Dubois de Saligny, Napoleon's representative, appointed the members of a Mexican puppet government tasked with ratifying French intentions of establishing a monarchy. On 8 July 1863, this so-called Assembly of Notables resolved to change the nation into a monarchy, inviting Napoleon's candidate, Maximilian of Habsburg, to become Emperor of Mexico.

In August, Forey and Saligny were recalled to France, and command over the French administration and the military of the conquered Mexican territories fell upon Marshal Bazaine, already present with the expedition, who officially assumed his post on 1 October 1862.

By October 1863 Díaz was placed in charge of the Eastern division of the Mexican military with command over 3000 men. General Díaz proceeded to sweep through the states of Queretaro, Michoacan, and Mexico, into Guerrero, proceeding to capture the rich silver-bearing town of Taxco on 29 October. Díaz then proceeded south toward Oaxaca recruiting more men on the way until his forces had swelled to 8000 troops. The state of Oaxaca would be his main base of operations for the rest of the war.

=== Commander of the South ===
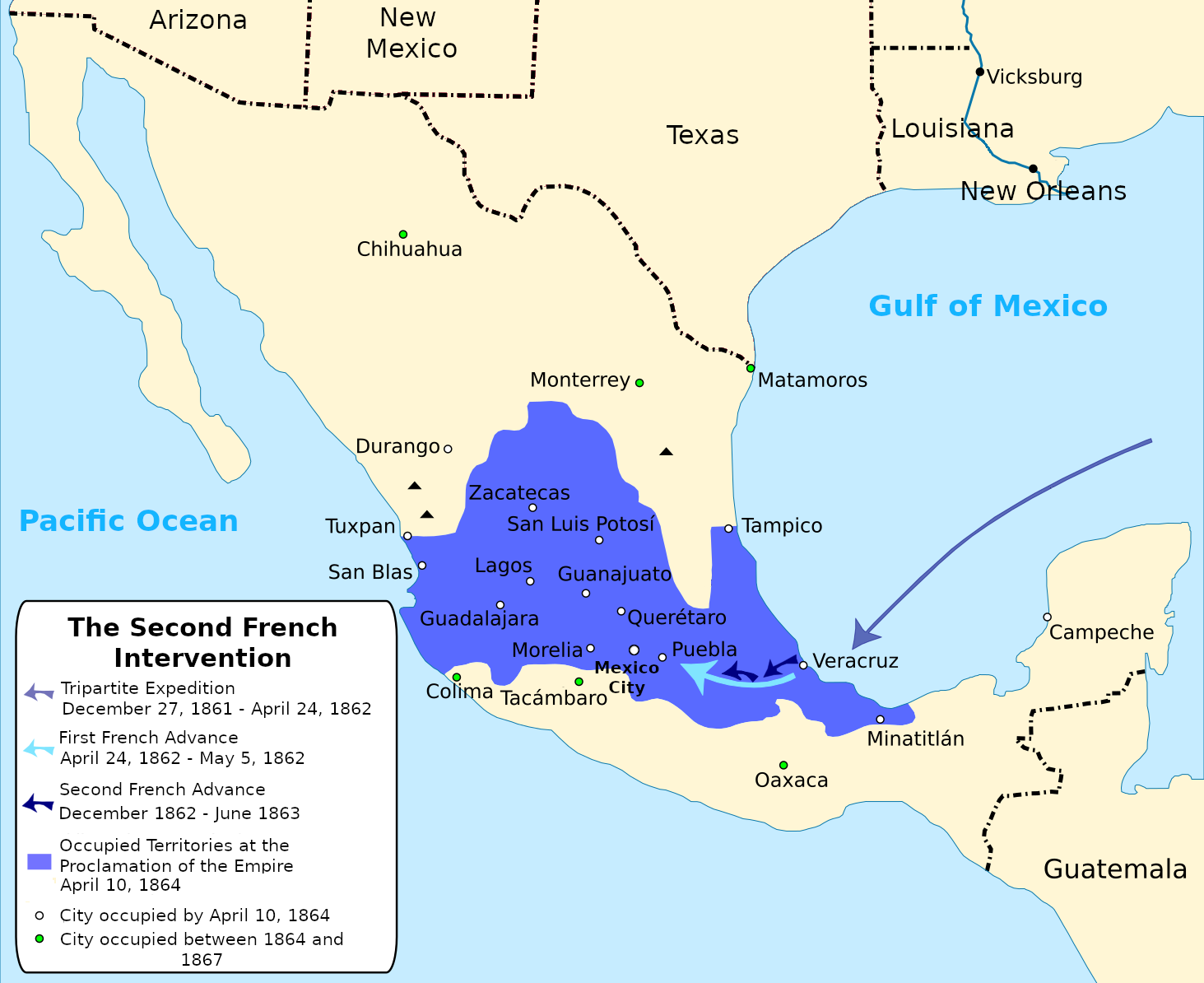
French controlled territories in 1864. Díaz at this time received command over all unoccupied southern Mexico

Porfirio Díaz was now not only the military but also the political commander over all unoccupied territories south of Veracruz. As the French made encroachments, forces under the command of Díaz managed in the Battle of San Juan Bautista to back the capital of Tabasco, in February 1864. Díaz's hold was consolidated enough that he began making excursions into Veracruz, and Minatitlán was taken by 28 March 1864.

Meanwhile, French control over central Mexico was rapidly expanding, and by March 1864 President Juárez had fled to Monterrey. Even as the northern military situation was dire, Díaz still maintained a solid hold over Guerrero, Oaxaca, Tabasco, and Chiapas. Meanwhile, Emperor Maximilian and his wife Charlotte, now Empress of Mexico finally arrived in Mexico City on 12 June 1864.

By December 1864, forces under Díaz had taken back the port of Acapulco. The French still struggled to make any inroads south against the forces commanded by Díaz and his lieutenant, the elderly Liberal caudillo, and former president of Mexico, Juan Álvarez. By the end of the year, the French were making scouting expeditions and building roads to make further attempts south.

Finally, in early 1865, a French expedition against Díaz's base of operations in Oaxaca City set out under General Courtois d'Hurbal by way of Yanhuitlan. Díaz evacuated Oaxaca City and began to build barricades while commanding 6000 troops for the defense of the city. It was such an important republican stronghold, that Bazaine himself assumed command of the operation in person.

By February 1865, the French had surrounded the city with siege materials and 7000 troops. An assault was scheduled for 9 February. Due to mass desertions which left him outnumbered ten to one, Díaz chose not to fight, instead surrendering unconditionally. Díaz and his officers were taken prisoner and sent to Puebla.

=== Second escape ===
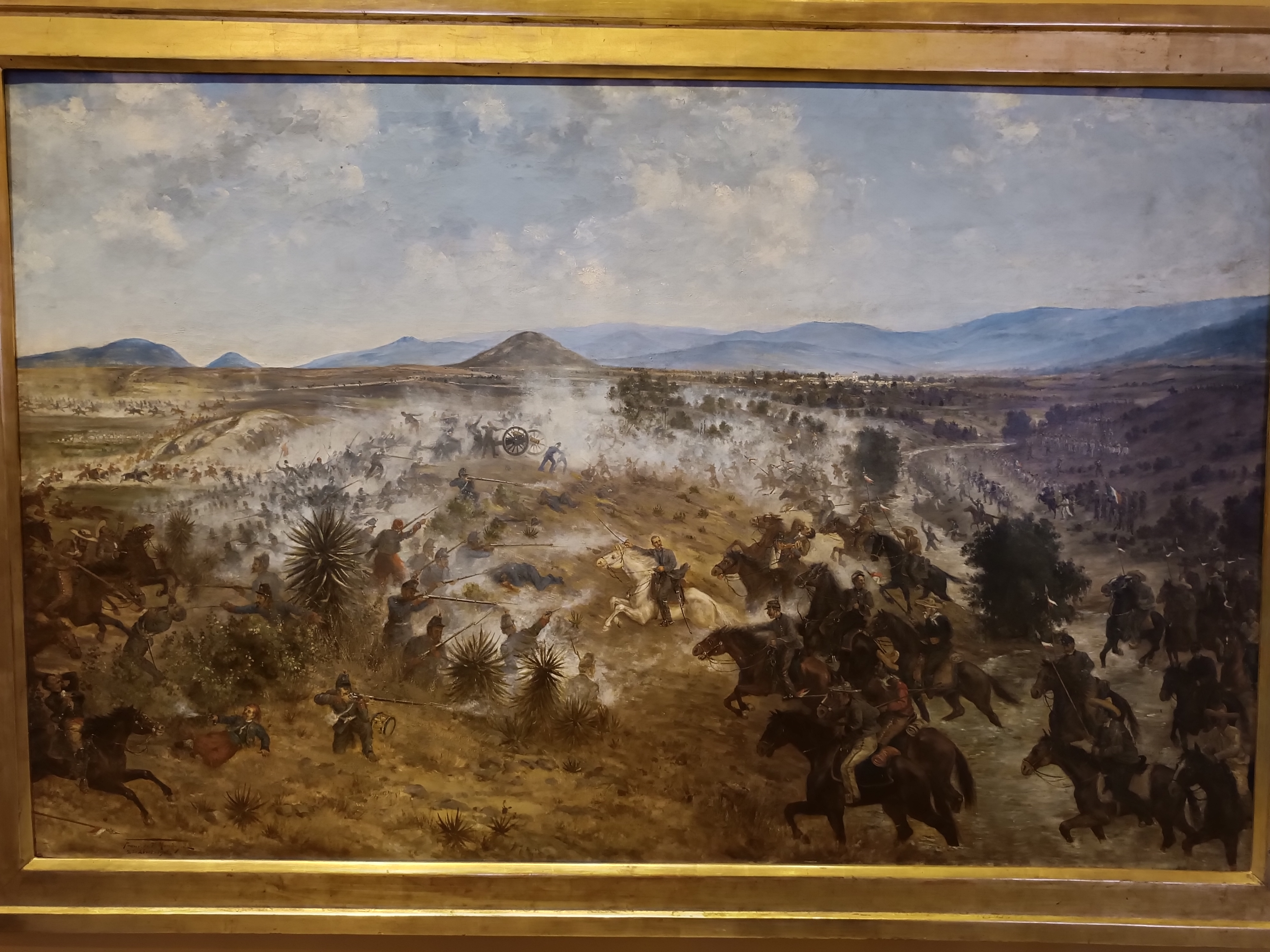
Díaz's victory in the Battle of Miahuatlán opened the way for his recapture of Oaxaca City

After being kept seven months in Puebla, Díaz managed to escape from French confinement yet again and returned to Oaxaca. When news of this reached Paris, former commander of the French Intervention, Forey who had once fought against Díaz at Puebla, criticized Bazaine for not having had Díaz shot immediately upon capturing him.

Throughout late 1865, as the French were still unable to secure the entire country, Napoleon III was led to the conclusion that France had gotten involved in a military quagmire. At the opening of the French Chambers in January 1866, he announced his intention of withdrawing French troops from Mexico. The French considered Emperor Maximilian to be doomed due to a lack of popular support and began to pressure him to abdicate.

French authorities considered forming an alternative Liberal government, more accommodating, and less humiliating to French interests than Juárez, and Díaz was proposed but ultimately rejected as a candidate to lead such a government due to his loyalty to Juárez. The alternative government scheme never materialized, Maximilian refused to abdicate, and the French left him in Mexico to his fate, the last French troops departing by March 1867.

=== Fall of the Second Mexican Empire ===
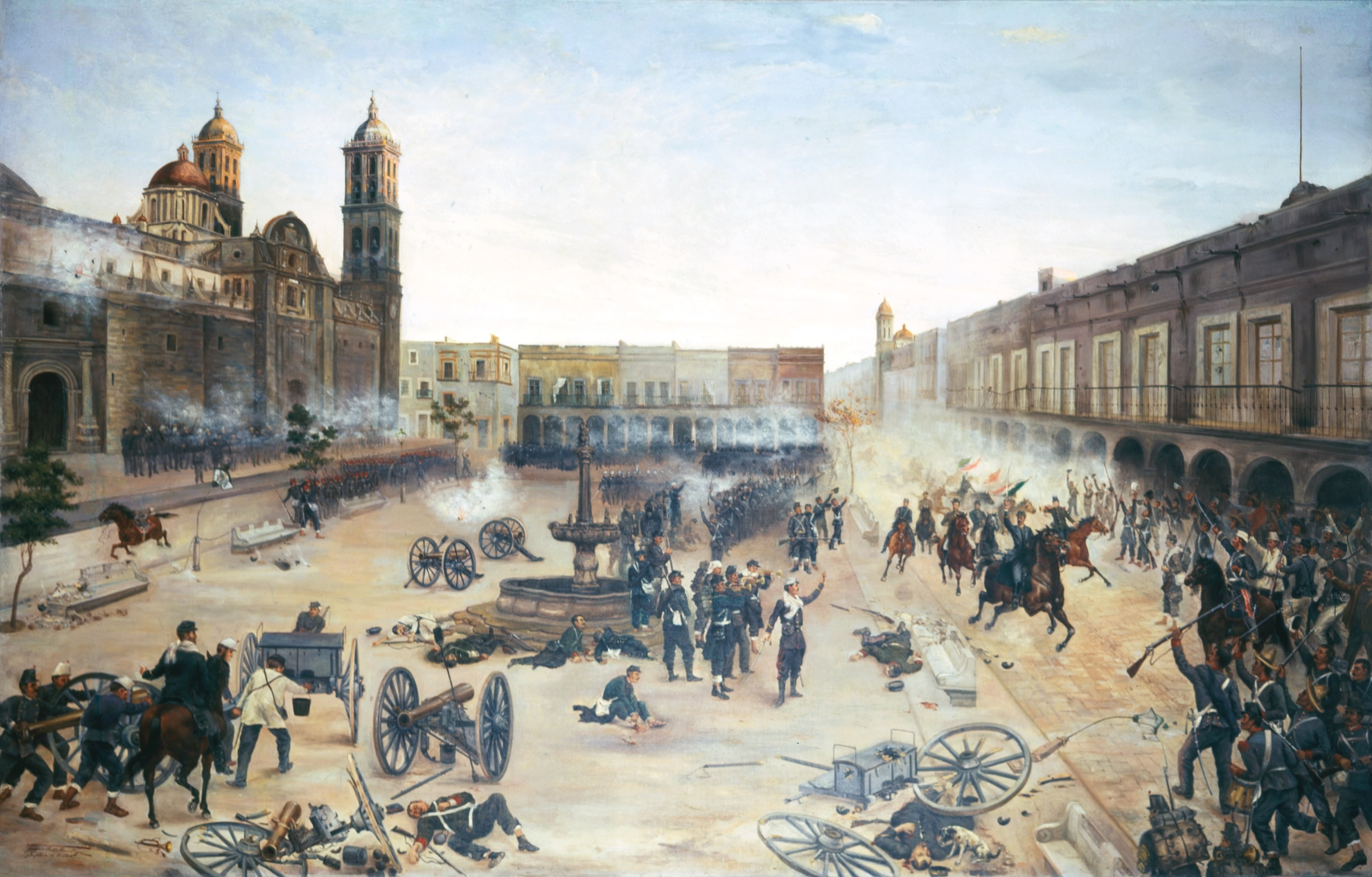
Painting depicting Díaz' entry into Puebla on 2 April 1867, after winning the Third Battle of Puebla

When Díaz returned to Oaxaca in late 1865, he found his army of the South dispersed, and enemy forces controlling the Oaxacan coast along with Tehuantepec. By Spring, 1866, Díaz had gained some victories, aided by local uprisings. He began to focus on cutting off communications between Oaxaca City and Veracruz Díaz won the Battle of Miahuatlán on 3 October, and then advanced upon Oaxaca City which surrendered by 1 November 1866. Most of southern Mexico except for certain areas of Yucatan were now back in the hands of the Mexican Republic.

Díaz now concentrated his forces in northern Oaxaca, Vera Cruz, Mexico, and Puebla for future operations. On 9 March 1867, Díaz began the Third Battle of Puebla, subjecting the city to an attack much like the one he had once defended it from, taking the city by 2 April. Díaz spared the troops, but ordered the execution of the officers, taunting them by saying that “even though they had not lived like men, they could die like men”.

All that remained of the Empire were Querétaro City, where Maximilian and his leading generals were present, Mexico City, and Veracruz, the latter two which had, through Díaz’ capture of Puebla, been cut off from communications with each other. Leonardo Márquez had been sent from Queretaro to relieve the siege of Puebla, but he was too late. Díaz pursued Márquez and a skirmish ensued on 8 April, but Márquez got away and made it back to Mexico City

=== Siege of Mexico City ===
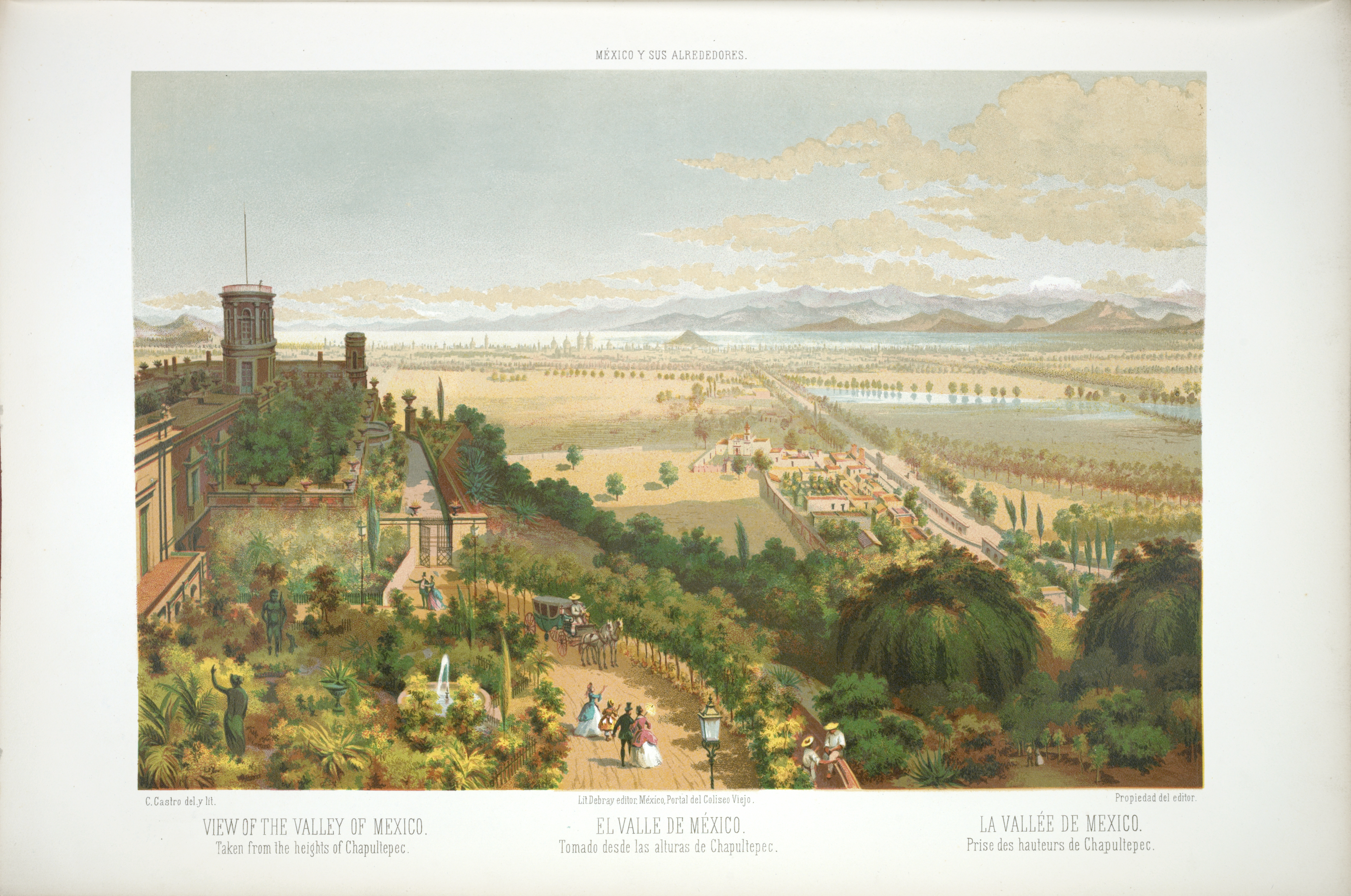
Díaz directed efforts to take back Mexico City from his headquarters at Chapultepec

Díaz now focused on taking back Mexico City and succeeded in seizing Chapultepec Castle, Maximilian's former residence, from its remaining imperial defenders, subsequently making it his headquarters. Díaz now had Mexico City surrounded with 28,000 troops yet being concerned with preventing damage to the capital he did not attack, and a seventy-day standoff ensued. Meanwhile, the Siege of Querétaro against Emperor Maximilian's headquarters was ongoing and ultimately ended by May 14 in a Liberal victory.

Even after Maximilian had been captured, Leonardo Márquez was stalling for time at Mexico City, but hope for the imperialists was running out. Márquez' officer General O’Horan went to meet Díaz without authorization and offered to surrender the city, warning Díaz that Márquez was about the escape, but Díaz rejected the offer. On 20 June, the day after Maximilian had been executed, Díaz ordered a barrage of artillery against the positions of the enemy, and his observers suddenly began to notice white flags of surrender. The remaining imperialist officers were arrested and it was discovered that Márquez had disappeared the day before. Upon occupying the city Díaz ordered his military bakers to begin supplying the city's starving population with food. He placed the city under martial law to prevent looting but also began a house-by-house search for any remaining imperialist officers. Márquez would never be found and he successfully escaped the country to find refuge in Cuba.

== Díaz rebels against the government ==
=== Plan de la Noria ===
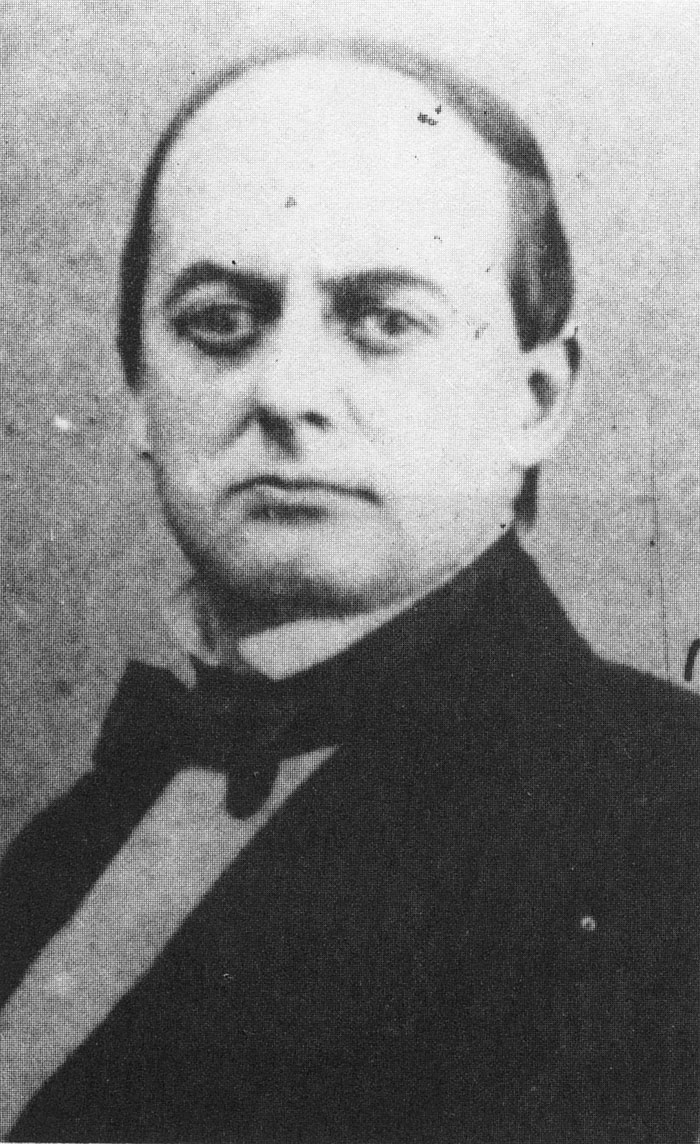
Porfirio Díaz would successfully overthrow President Sebastian Lerdo de Tejada in 1876

Díaz declared himself a candidate for presidential elections scheduled for August 1867 Meanwhile, President Juarez proposed certain amendments to the constitution, and opponents of them began to coalesce around Diaz's campaign. Juárez subsequently won the presidential election and began a new term scheduled to end on 30 November 1871.

Juárez controversially once more declared his candidacy for the 1871 elections which he won again against Díaz. Supporters of Díaz accused the government of engaging in election fraud, refused to recognize Juárez as the legitimate president, and prepared to take up arms. The subsequent insurrection would come to be known as the Plan de la Noria from the eponymous Oaxacan town in which the revolution was proclaimed on 8 November 1871.

Supporting revolts flared up across the country, but Juárez sustained himself against them until dying in office on 18 July 1872, the presidency passing on to the legal successor Sebastian Lerdo de Tejada.

President Lerdo offered an amnesty to the rebels in July 1872, an offer which many commanders subsequently took. Díaz himself refused it, and on 1 August, sent a letter to the president urging a modification of the amnesty terms and urging an extension for upcoming presidential elections in October ostensibly to allow rebellious regions to fully participate. The president was unyielding but so was Díaz, who urged Lerdo, in a later communication to also initiate constitutional reforms to prohibit presidential reelection.

As more rebel commanders yielded and the October elections came and went with Lerdo winning an overwhelming majority of votes, Díaz realized that his case was hopeless and finally submitted unconditionally before the amnesty in late October.

=== Plan of Tuxtepec ===
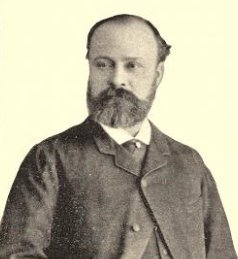
Díaz's victory over General Ignacio R. Alatorre at the Battle of Tecoac opened the way for Díaz to occupy Mexico City.

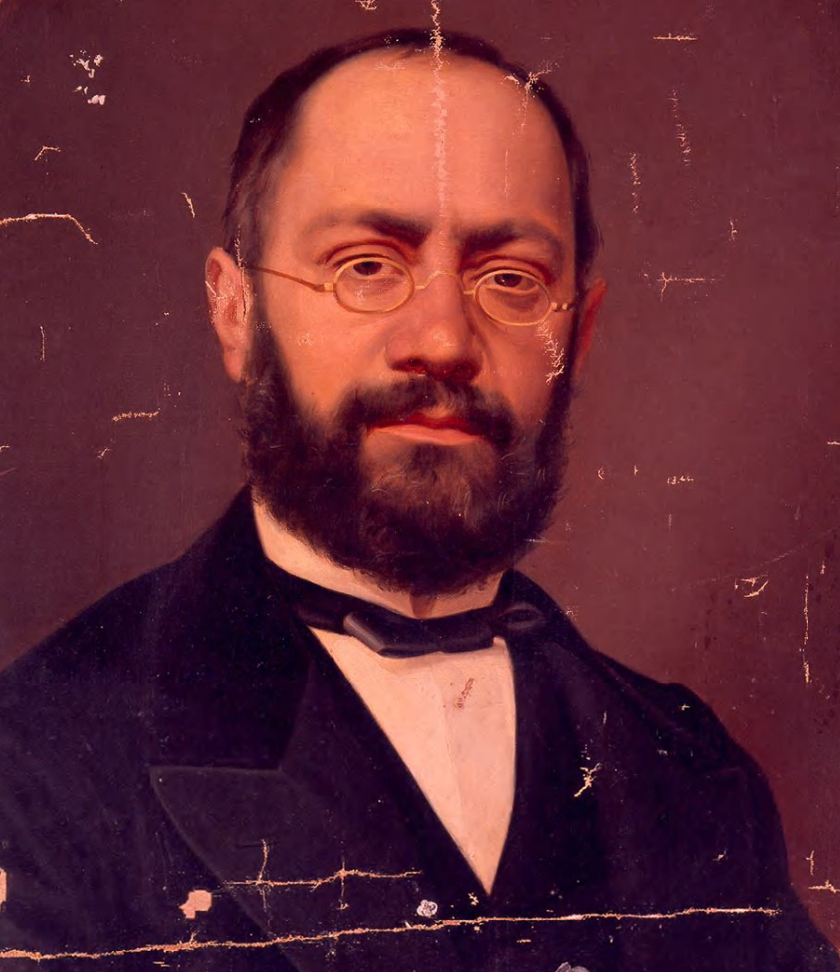
Even after the fall of Lerdo, Díaz had to deal with the rival movement of José María Iglesias.

Díaz was eventually restored to official military rank in 1874 but retired to private life, and subsequently moved to the United States in December 1875, settling in Brownsville, Texas, across the border from Matamoros.

In early 1876, President Lerdo doomed his already unpopular presidency by announcing his plans for re-election scheduled for June of that year. On 15 January 1876, the Plan of Tuxtepec was proclaimed in Tuxtepec, Oaxaca. Porfirio Díaz was invited to assume leadership of the revolution.

As support for the Tuxtepec Plan rapidly spread throughout the country, Díaz returned to the country on March 22. At the town of Palo Blanco, he published a revised version of the Tuxtepec Plan. The plan was a miscellaneous set of critiques against the Lerdo Administration focusing on the claim that the president's domination of the electoral process rendered free suffrage null. Díaz was declared the military leader of the revolution and Lerdo was declared deposed along with all governors who would not accede to the Tuxtepec Plan. The interim executive was first offered to the president of the supreme court and legal successor to the president José María Iglesias, but he rejected any role in the plan as a violation of the constitution. The revolutionaries now recognized Díaz as president. This uprising was virtually the last of its kind in the nineteenth century and put an end to the era of pronunciamientos. From 1821 to 1876, more than 1,500 pronunciamientos had taken place all over Mexico, calling for or supporting a revolt, usually against the national government. The practice faded away thereafter.

As federalist forces under Mariano Escobedo approached Díaz, the latter was forced to take flight, intending to rejoin the revolution in his familiar base of Oaxaca. He crossed back into the United States, disguised himself as a Cuban doctor, and boarded a steamer bound for Veracruz. He was detected by military officers on board as the ship approached Veracruz. Although the ship was four miles from the coast, Díaz jumped overboard and attempted to swim ashore, but officers sent a boat after him and he was returned to the ship. The ship's purser, Alexander Kaufman Coney, a fellow Mason, was sympathetic to Díaz and helped him escape again from which he hastened to Oaxaca, arriving by July.

On 15 November, as Díaz approached Mexico City from Oaxaca his troops clashed at Tecoac with those of the federalist General Alatorre. The outcome of the hours-long battle hung in the balance, but Díaz routed the Federalist troops after reinforcements arrived. Mexico City now lay open to Díaz's forces, and President Lerdo de Tejada, realizing his cause was lost, evacuated the capital with military and civilian supporters, intending to flee the country.

After the elections of July, a rival revolt known as the Plan of Salamanca had flared up under Iglesias, alleging that Lerdo's election had been fraudulent and that he was now the legitimate president of Mexico until legal elections could be held. Iglesias began to correspond with Díaz, hoping to unite their movements, but no agreement could be reached, even after the flight of Lerdo.

Díaz entered Mexico City on 29 November and finally ascended to the presidency. He organized his cabinet but now focused on crushing the movement of Iglesias and set out for the latter's base in Guanajuato with 10,000 men.

Iglesias began to experience mass defections in both political and military support and after a series of failed negotiations with Díaz in December, decided upon giving up and departing the country. The victorious Díaz reentered the capital on 12 February 1877.

== Becoming president and first term, 1876–1880 ==
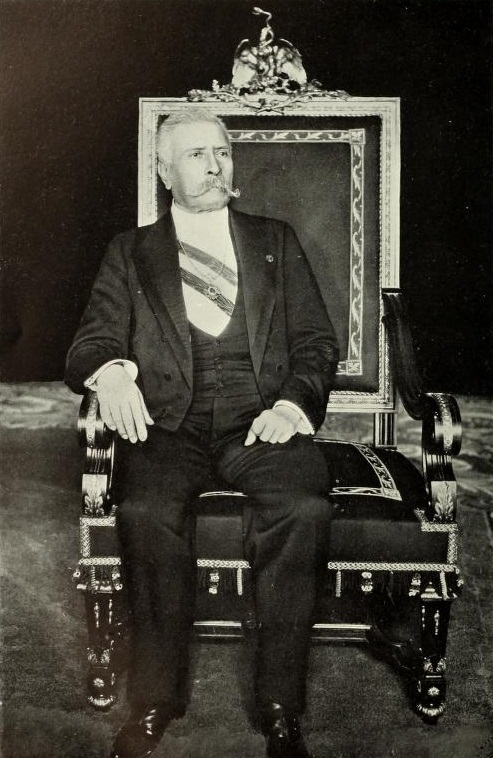
Díaz wearing the presidential sash

Díaz did not take formal control of the presidency until the beginning of 1877, putting in General Juan N. Méndez as provisional president, followed by new presidential elections in 1877 that gave Díaz the presidency. Ironically, one of his government's first amendments to the liberal 1857 constitution was to prevent re-election.

Although the new election gave some air of legitimacy to Díaz's government, the United States did not recognize the regime. It was not clear that Díaz would continue to prevail against supporters of ousted President Lerdo, who continued to challenge Díaz's regime by insurrections, which ultimately failed. While Díaz’ revolts were against extreme power centralization, once in power Díaz strengthened the central state further, so much so that the probability of a coup or a factional rebellion like his decreased markedly thereafter. In addition, cross-border Apache attacks with raids on one side and sanctuary on the other were a sticking point. Mexico needed to meet several conditions before the U.S. would consider recognizing Díaz's government, including payment of a debt to the U.S. and restraining the cross-border Apache raids. The U.S. emissary to Mexico, John W. Foster, had the duty to protect the interests of the U.S. first and foremost. Lerdo's government had entered into negotiations with the U.S. over claims that each had against the other in previous conflicts. A joint U.S.-Mexico Claims Commission was established in 1868, in the wake of the fall of the French Empire. When Díaz seized power from Lerdo's government, he inherited Lerdo's negotiated settlement with the U.S. As Mexican historian Daniel Cosío Villegas put it, "He Who Wins Pays." Díaz secured recognition by paying $300,000 to settle claims by the U.S. In 1878, the U.S. government recognized the Díaz regime, and former U.S. president and Civil War hero Ulysses S. Grant visited Mexico.

During his first term in office, Díaz developed a pragmatic and personalist approach to solving political conflicts. Although a political liberal who had stood with radical liberals in Oaxaca (rojos), he was not a liberal ideologue, preferring pragmatic approaches towards political issues. He was explicit about his pragmatism. He maintained control through generous patronage of political allies. In his first term, members of his political alliance were discontented that they had not sufficiently benefited from political and financial rewards. In general, he sought conciliation, but force could be an option. "'Five fingers or five bullets,' as he was fond of saying." Although he had authoritarian views, he maintained the structure of elections, so that there was the façade of liberal democracy. His administration became famous for the suppression of civil society and public revolts. One of the catchphrases of his later terms in office was the choice between "pan o palo", ("bread or the bludgeon")—that is, "benevolence or repression". Díaz saw his task in his term as president to create internal order so that economic development could be possible. He also included in his coalition a middle-class contingent from small townships that contested vestigial oligarchies, further consolidating the power of the national state over governors and peripheral elites. As a military hero and astute politician, Díaz's eventual successful establishment of that peace (Paz Porfiriana) became "one of [Díaz's] principal achievements, and it became the main justification for successive re-elections after 1884."

Díaz and his advisers' pragmatism about the United States became the policy of "defensive modernization", which attempted to make the best of Mexico's weak position against its northern neighbor. Attributed to Díaz was the phrase "so far from God, so close to the United States." Díaz's advisers Matías Romero, Juárez's emissary to the U.S., and Manuel Zamacona, a minister in Juárez's government, advised a policy of "peaceful invasion" of U.S. capital to Mexico, with the expectation that it would then be "naturalized" in Mexico. In their view, such an arrangement would "provide 'all possible advantages of annexation without ....its inconveniences'." Díaz was won over to that viewpoint, which promoted Mexican economic development and gave the U.S. an outlet for its capital and allowed for its influence in Mexico. By 1880, Mexico was forging a new relationship with the U.S. as Díaz's term of office was ending.

== González presidency, 1880–1884 ==
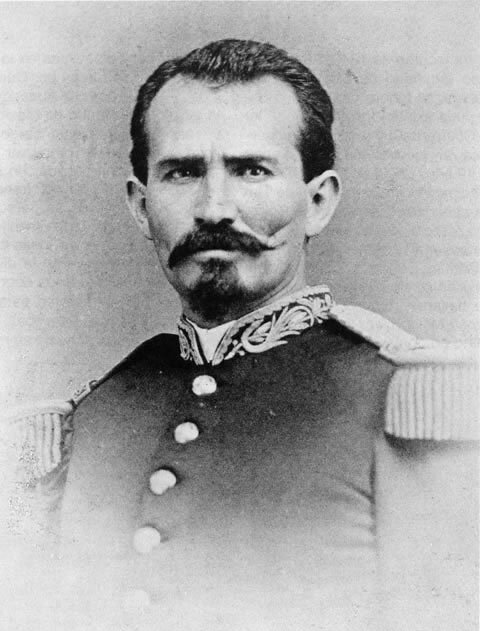
President Manuel González

Díaz stepped down from the presidency, with his ally, General Manuel González, one of the trustworthy members of his political network (camarilla), elected president in a fully constitutional manner. This four-year period, often characterized as the "González Interregnum", is sometimes seen as Díaz placing a puppet in the presidency, but González ruled in his own right and was viewed as a legitimate president free of the taint of coming to power by coup. During this period, Díaz briefly served as governor of his home state of Oaxaca. He also devoted time to his personal life, highlighted by his marriage to Carmen Romero Rubio, the devout 17-year-old daughter of Manuel Romero Rubio, a supporter of Lerdo. The couple honeymooned in the U.S., going to the World Cotton Centennial in New Orleans, then St. Louis, Washington, D.C., and New York. Accompanying them on their travels was Matías Romero and his U.S.-born wife. This working honeymoon allowed Díaz to forge personal connections with politicians and powerful businessmen with Romero's friends, including former U.S. President Ulysses S. Grant. Romero then publicized the growing amity between the two countries and the safety of Mexico for U.S. investors.

President González was making room in his government for political networks not originally part of Díaz's coalition, some of whom had been loyalists to Lerdo, including Evaristo Madero, whose grandson Francisco would challenge Díaz for the presidency in 1910. Important legislation changing rights to land and subsoil rights, and encouraging immigration and colonization by U.S. nationals was passed during the González presidency. The administration also extended lucrative railway concessions to U.S. investors. Despite those developments, the González administration met financial and political difficulties, with the later period bringing the government to bankruptcy and popular opposition. Díaz's father-in-law Manuel Romero Rubio linked these issues to personal corruption by González. Despite Díaz's previous protestations of "no re-election", he ran for a second term in the 1884 elections.

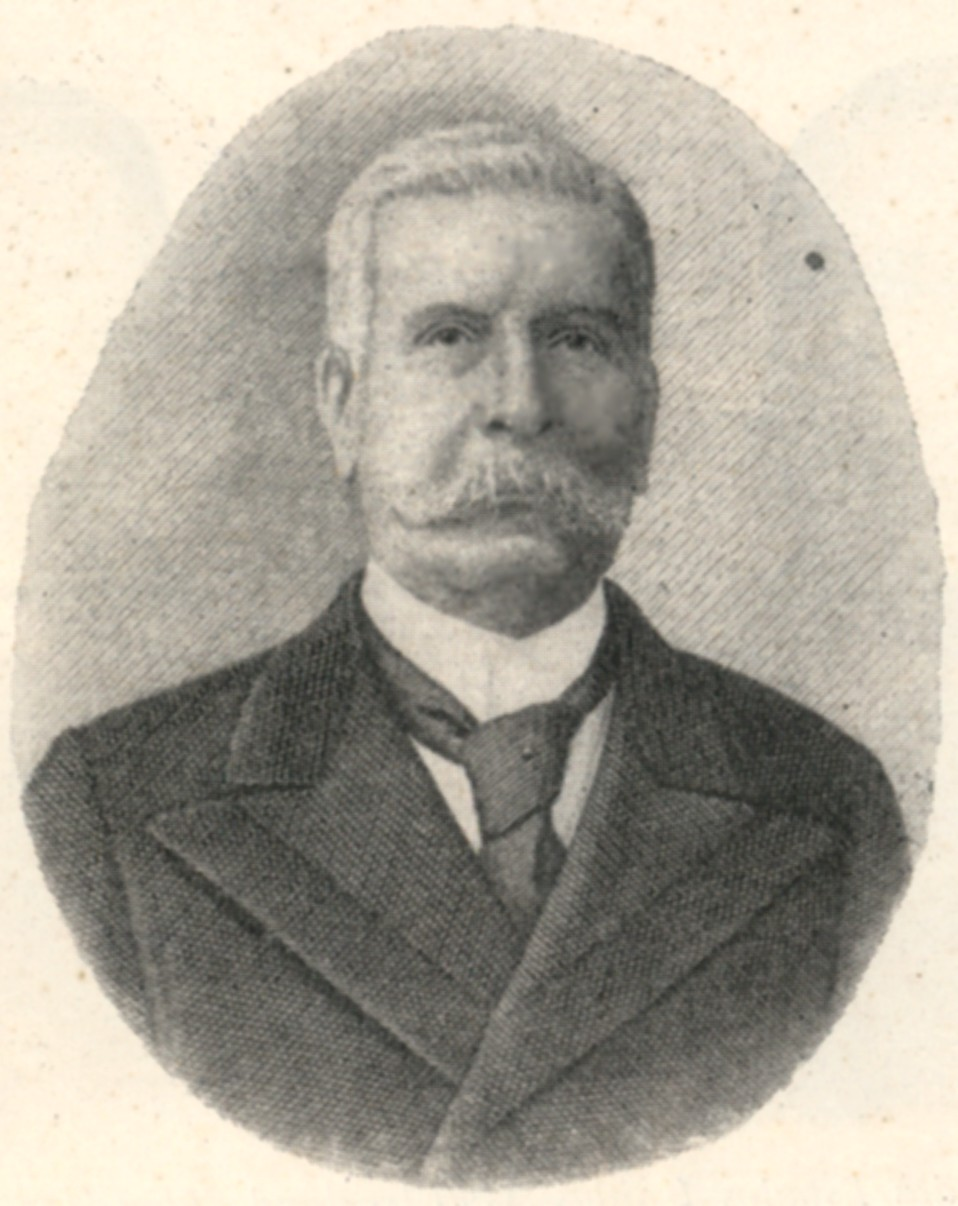
Porfirio Díaz circa 1880

During this period the Mexican underground political newspapers spread the new ironic slogan for the Porfirian Times, based on the slogan "Sufragio Efectivo, No Reelección" (Effective suffrage, no re-election) and changed it to its opposite, "Sufragio Efectivo No, Reelección" (Effective suffrage – No. Re-election!). Díaz had the constitution amended, first to allow two terms in office, and then to remove all restrictions on re-election. With these changes in place, Díaz was re-elected four more times by implausibly high margins, and on some occasions claimed to have won with either unanimous or near-unanimous support.

Over the next twenty-six years as president, Díaz created a systematic and methodical regime with a staunch military mindset. His first goal was to establish peace throughout Mexico. According to John A. Crow, Díaz "set out to establish a good strong Paz Porfiriana, or Porfirian peace, of such scope and firmness that it would redeem the country in the eyes of the world for its sixty-five years of revolution and anarchy" since independence. His second goal was outlined in his motto – "little of politics and plenty of administration", meaning the replacement of open political conflict by a well-functioning government apparatus. During this time, Mexico underwent its most profound economic, political, and social transformation since the advent of independence in 1821.

== Administration, 1884–1896 ==
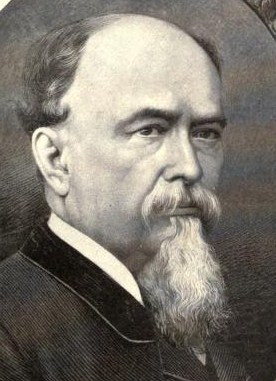
Manuel Romero Rubio, cabinet minister and Díaz's father-in-law

To secure his power, Díaz engaged in various forms of co-optation and coercion. He constantly balanced between the private desires of different interest groups and playing off one interest against another. Following the González presidency, Díaz abandoned favoring his political group (camarilla) that brought him to power in 1876 in the Plan of Tuxtepec and selected ministers and other high officials from other factions. Those included those loyal to Juárez (Matías Romero) and Lerdo (Manuel Romero Rubio). Manuel Dublán was one of the few loyalists from the Plan of Tuxtepec that Díaz retained as a cabinet minister. As money flowed to the Mexican treasury from foreign investments, Díaz could buy off his loyalists from Tuxtepec. An important group supporting the regime were foreign investors, especially from the U.S. and Great Britain, as well as Germany and France. Díaz himself met with investors, binding him with this group in a personal rather than institutional fashion. The close cooperation between these foreign elements and the Díaz regime was a key nationalist issue in the Mexican Revolution.

To satisfy any competing domestic forces, such as mestizos and Indigenous leaders, Díaz gave them political positions or made them intermediates for foreign interests. He acted similarly to rural elites by not interfering with their wealth and haciendas. The urban middle classes in Mexico City were often in opposition to the government, but with the country's economic prosperity and the expansion of the government, they had job opportunities in federal employment.

Covering both pro- and anti-clerical elements, Díaz was both the head of the Freemasons in Mexico and an important advisor to the Catholic bishops. Díaz proved to be a different kind of liberal than those of the past. He neither assaulted the Church nor protected it. With the influx of foreign investment and investors, Protestant missionaries arrived in Mexico, especially in Mexico's north, and Protestants became an opposition force during the Mexican Revolution.

Although there was factionalism in the ruling group and some regions, Díaz suppressed the formation of opposition parties. Díaz dissolved all local authorities and all aspects of federalism that once existed. Not long after he became president, the governors of all federal states in Mexico answered directly to him. Those who held high positions of power, such as members of the legislature, were almost entirely his closest and most loyal friends. Congress was a rubber stamp for his policy plans and they were compliant in amending the 1857 Constitution to allow his re-election and extension of the presidential term. In his quest for political control, Díaz suppressed the press and controlled the court system. Díaz could intervene in political matters that threatened political stability, such as in the conflict in the northern Mexican state of Coahuila, placing José María Garza Galan in the governorship, undercutting wealthy estate owner Evaristo Madero, grandfather of Francisco I. Madero, who would challenge Díaz in the 1910 election. In another case, Díaz placed General Bernardo Reyes in the governorship of the state of Nuevo León, displacing existing political elites.

A key supporter of Díaz was former Lerdista Manuel Romero Rubio. According to historian Friedrich Katz, "Romero Rubio was in many respects the architect of the Porfirian state." The relationship between the two was cemented when Díaz married Romero Rubio's young daughter, Carmen. Romero Rubio and his supporters did not oppose the amendment to the Constitution to allow Díaz's initial re-election and then indefinite re-election. One of Romero Rubio's protégés was José Yves Limantour, who became the main financial adviser to the regime, stabilizing the country's public finances. Limantour's political network was dubbed the Científicos, "the scientists", for their approach to governance. They sought reforms, such as decreasing corruption and increasing uniform application of laws. Díaz opposed any significant reform and continued to appoint governors and legislators and control the judiciary.

== Díaz and the military ==
Díaz had not trained as a soldier, but made his career in the military during a tumultuous era of the U.S. invasion of Mexico, the age of General Antonio López de Santa Anna, the Reform War, and the Second French Intervention. A study of his presidential cabinets found that 83% of cabinet members old enough had fought in one or more of those conflicts. The tradition of post-independence Mexico of the military intervening and dominance over civilian politicians continued under Díaz. A closer study shows that over time prominent military figures increasingly played a much smaller role in his government. Civilian politicians loyal to him rather than his military comrades in arms came to dominate his cabinet. His regime was not a military dictatorship but rather had strong civilian allies. His replacement of military advisors for civilians signaled that it was civilians who held power in the political arena.

In office, Díaz was able to bring provincial military strongmen under the control of the central government, a process that took fifteen years. He provided opportunities for graft for military men he could not successfully confront on the battlefield. Ample salaries helped maintain the loyalty of others. Dangerous military leaders could be sent on foreign missions to study military training in Europe as well as nonmilitary issues, and thereby keep them out of Mexico. Officers who retired could receive half the salary of their highest rank. He created military zones that were not contiguous with state boundaries and rotated the commanders regularly, preventing them from becoming entrenched in any one zone, then extended the practice to lower-ranking officers. "Díaz destroyed provincial militarism and developed in its stead a national army that sustained the central government."

A potential opposition force was the Mexican Federal Army. Troops were often men forced into military service and poorly paid. Díaz increased the size of the military budget and began modernizing the institution along the lines of European militaries, including the establishment in 1897 of separate military academies to train army and naval officers. High-rank officers were brought into government service. Díaz expanded the crack police force, the Rurales, who were under the control of the president. Díaz knew that he needed to suppress banditry; he expanded the Rurales, although it guarded chiefly only transport routes to major cities. Díaz thus worked to enhance his control over the military and the police. By the time of the outbreak of the Mexican Revolution in 1910, the Federal Army had an aging leadership, and disgruntled troops, and they were unable to control the revolutionary forces in active multiple locations.

== Relations with the Catholic Church ==
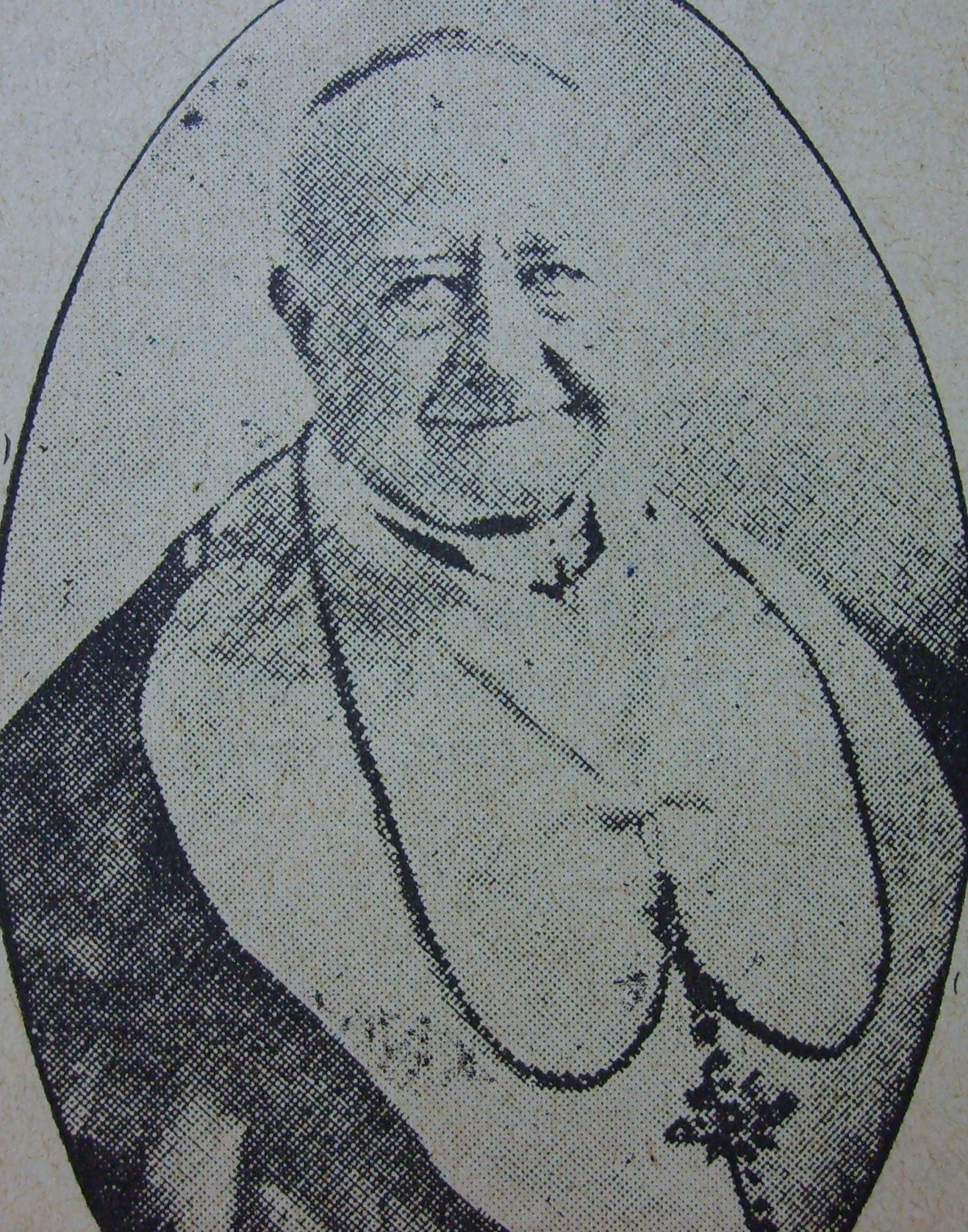
Archbishop of Oaxaca, Eulogio Gillow y Zavala, key broker of Porfirio Díaz's policy of conciliation with the Catholic Church

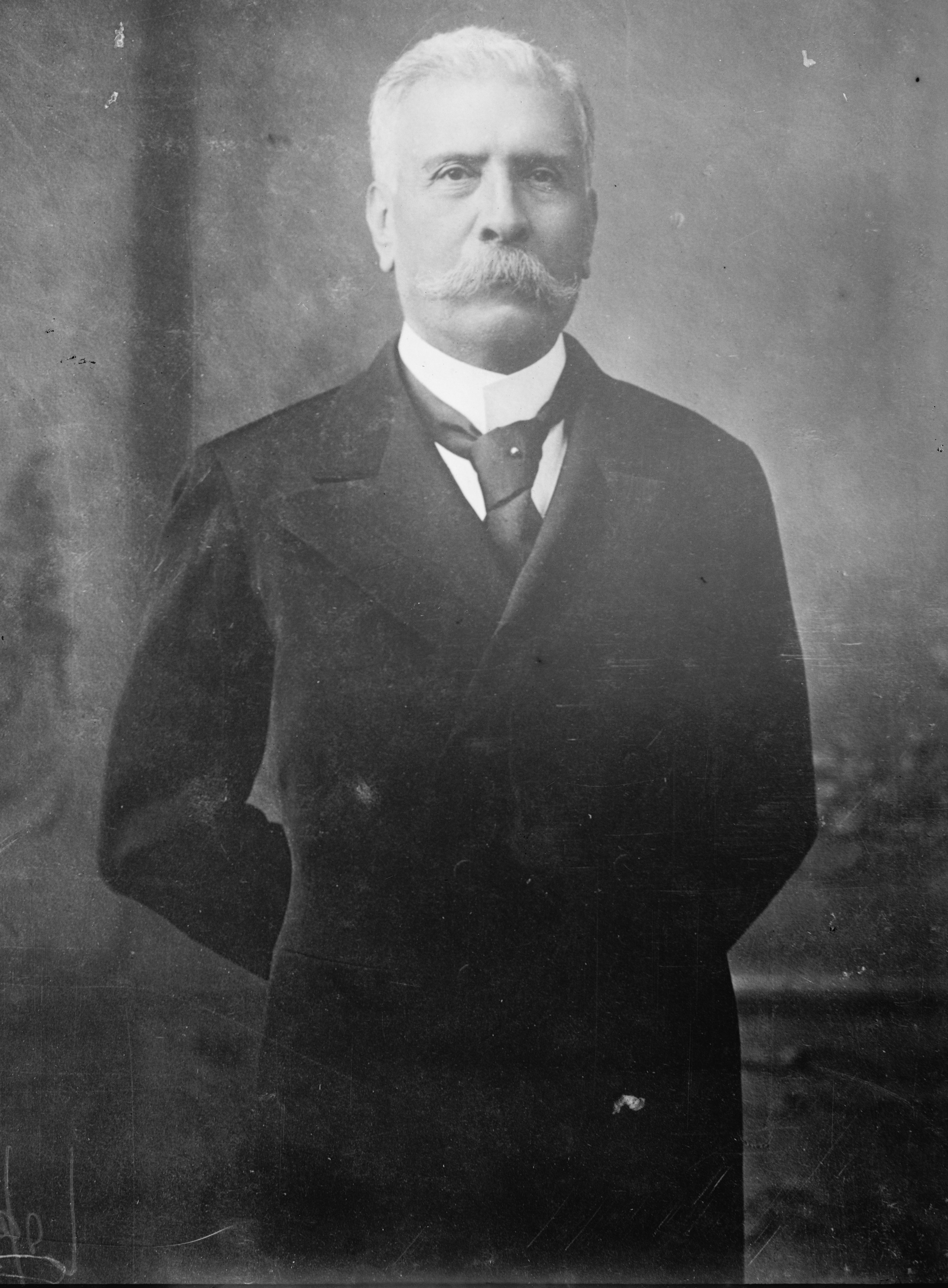
Porfirio Díaz in civilian clothing

Unlike other Mexican liberals, Díaz was not anti-clerical, which became a political advantage when Díaz came to power. He won over conservatives, including the Catholic Church as an institution and social conservatives supporting it.

Radical liberalism was anti-clerical, seeing the privileges of the Church as challenging the idea of equality before the law and individual, rather than corporate identity. They considered the economic power of the Catholic Church a detriment to modernization and development. The Church as a major corporate landowner and de facto banking institution shaped investments to conservative landed estates more than industry, infrastructure building, or exports. In power after the ouster of Santa Anna, liberals implemented legal measures to curtail the power of the Church. The Juárez Law abolished special privileges (fueros) of ecclesiastics and the military, and the Lerdo law mandated disentailment of the property of corporations, specifically the Church and Indigenous communities. The liberal constitution of 1857 removed the privileged position of the Catholic Church and opened the way to religious tolerance, considering religious expression as freedom of speech. Catholic priests were ineligible for elective office but could vote. Conservatives fought back in the Reform War, under the banner of religión y fueros (religion and privileges), but were defeated in 1861. Following the fall of the Second Empire in 1867, liberal president Benito Juárez and his successor Sebastián Lerdo de Tejada began implementing the anti-clerical measures of the constitution. Lerdo went further, extending the laws of the Reform to formalize the separation of Church and State; civil marriage as the only valid manner for State recognition; prohibitions of religious corporations to acquire real estate; elimination of religious elements from legal oaths; and the elimination of monastic vows as legally binding. Further prohibitions on the Church in 1874 included the exclusion of religion in public institutions; restriction of religious acts to church precincts; banning of religious garb in public except within churches; and prohibition of the ringing of church bells except to summon parishioners.

Díaz was a political pragmatist, seeing that the religious question re-opened political discord in Mexico. When he rebelled against Lerdo, Díaz had at least the tacit and perhaps even the explicit support of the Catholic Church. When he came to power in 1877, Díaz left the anti-clerical laws in place, but no longer enforced them as state policy, leaving that to individual Mexican states. This led to the re-emergence of the Church in many areas but in others a less full role. The Church flouted the Reform prohibitions against wearing clerical garb, there were open-air processions and Masses, and religious orders existed. The Church also recovered its property, sometimes through intermediaries, and tithes were again collected. The church regained its role in education, with the complicity of the Díaz regime which did not invest in public education. The Church also regained its role in running charitable institutions. Despite the increasingly visible role of the Catholic Church during the Porfiriato, the Vatican was unsuccessful in getting the reinstatement of a formal relationship between the papacy and Mexico, and the constitutional limitations of the Church as an institution remained as law.

This modus vivendi between Díaz and the Church had pragmatic and positive consequences. Díaz did not publicly renounce liberal anti-clericalism, meaning that the Constitution of 1857 remained in place, but he did not enforce its anti-clerical measures. Conflict could reignite, but it was to the advantage of both the Church and the Díaz government for this arrangement to continue. If the Church did counter Díaz, he had the constitutional means to rein in its power. The Church regained considerable economic power, with conservative intermediaries holding lands for it. The Church remained important in education and charitable institutions. Other important symbols of the normalization of religion in late 19th century Mexico included: the return of the Jesuits (expelled by the Bourbon Charles III in 1767); the crowning of the Virgin of Guadalupe as "Queen of Mexico"; and the support of Mexican bishops for Díaz's work as a peacemaker. When the Mexican Revolution broke out in 1910, the Catholic Church was a staunch supporter of the Díaz regime.

== Economic liberalization under Díaz ==
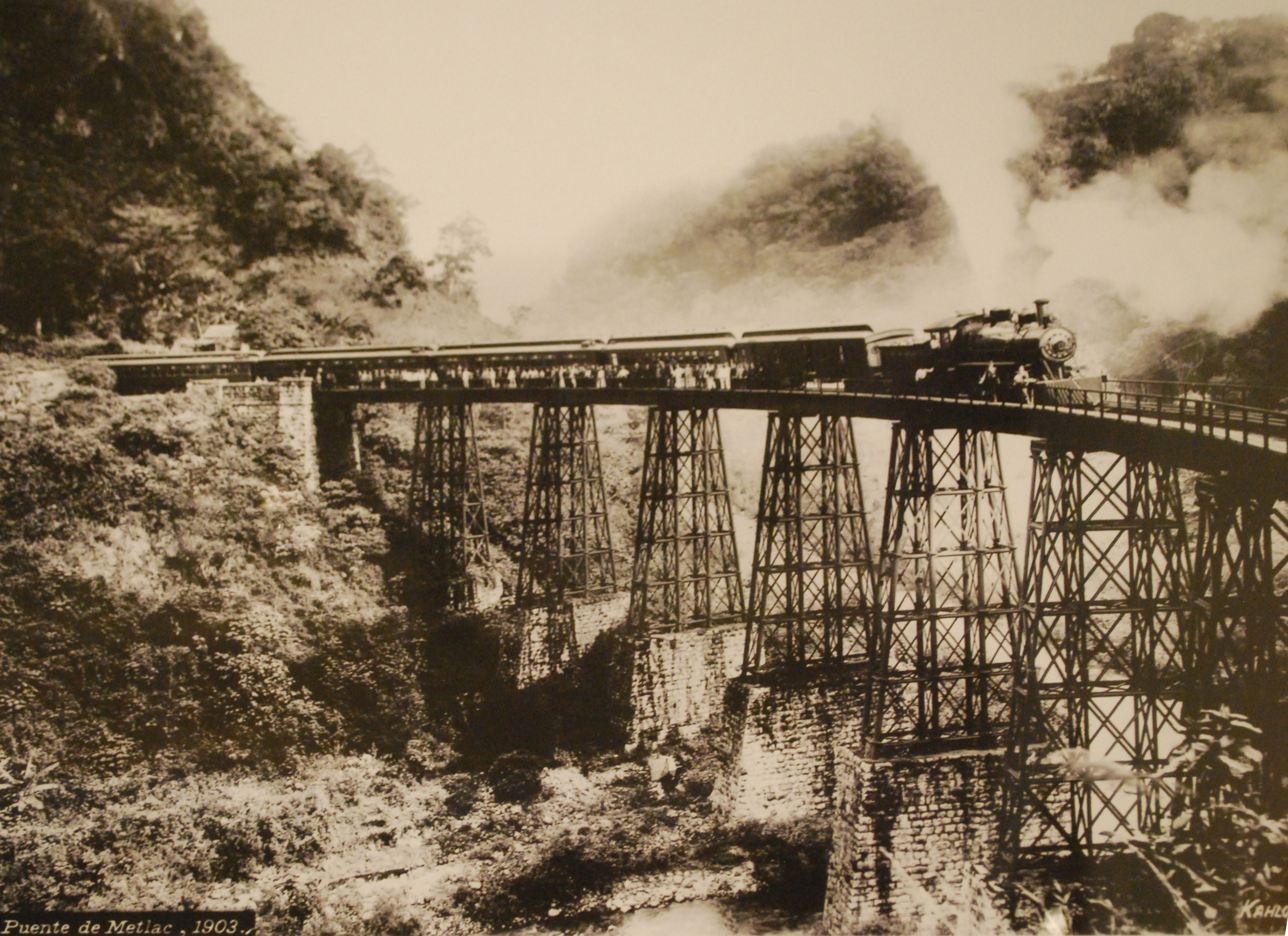
The Metlac railway bridge, an example of engineering achievement that overcame geographical barriers and allowed efficient movement of goods and people. Photo by Guillermo Kahlo.

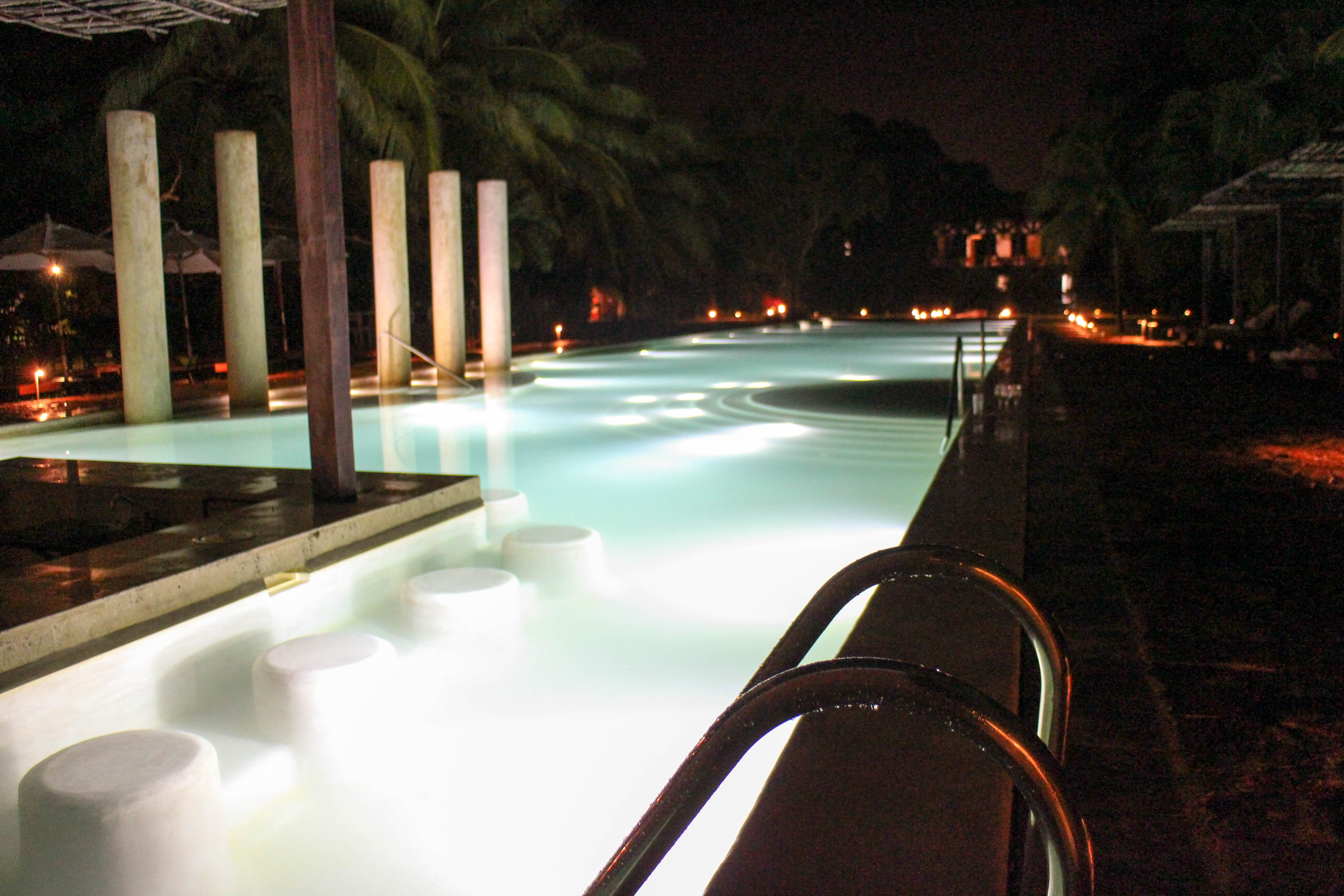
Hacienda Temozón refurbished into a Marriott-licensed hotel by night on 3 November 2018. This hacienda was approached for industrial mass production during Porfiriato.

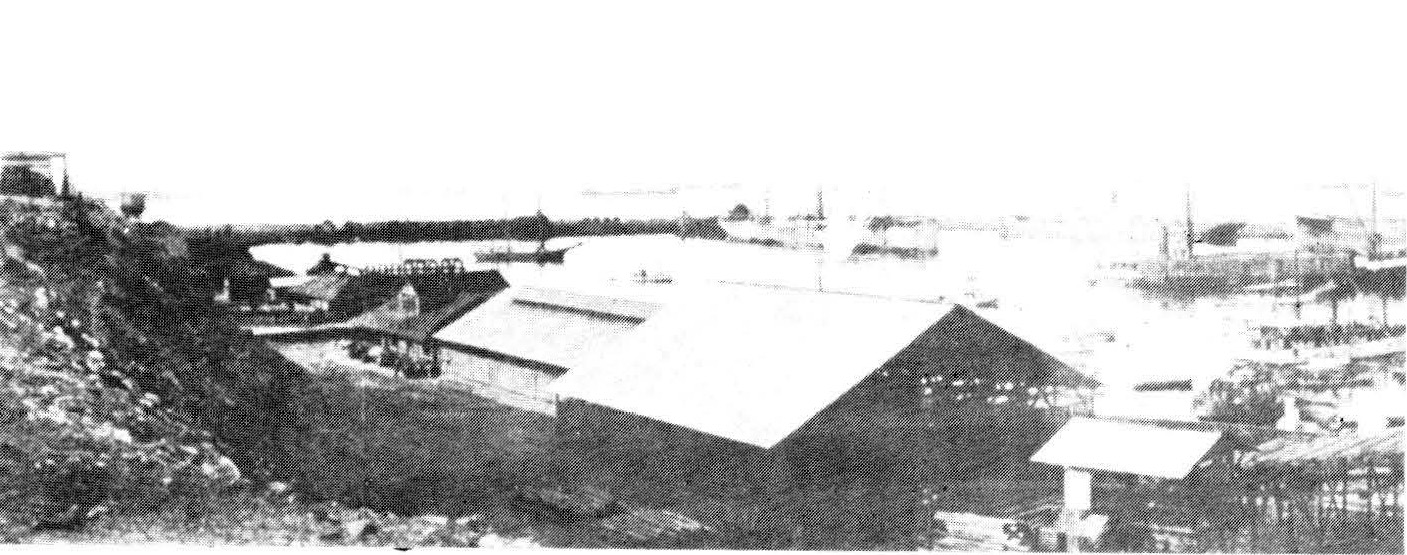
El Boleo's mill

Díaz sought to attract foreign investment to Mexico to aid the development of mining, agriculture, industry, and infrastructure. Political stability and the revision of laws, some dating to the colonial era, created a legal structure and an atmosphere where entrepreneurs felt secure in investing capital in Mexico. Railways, financed by foreign capital, transformed areas that were remote from markets into productive regions. The government mandate to survey land meant that secure title was established for investors. The process often obliterated claims of local communities that could not prove title or extinguished traditional usage of forests and other areas not under cultivation. The private survey companies bid for contracts from the Mexican government, with the companies acquiring one-third of the land measured, often prime land that was along proposed railway routes. Companies usually sold that land, often to foreigners who pursued large-scale cultivation of crops for export. Crops included coffee, rubber, henequen (for twine used in binding wheat), sugar, wheat, and vegetable production. Land only suitable for pasturage was enclosed with barbed wire, extinguishing traditional communal grazing of cattle, and premium cattle were imported. Owners of large, landed estates (haciendas) often took the opportunity to sell to foreign investors as well. The result by the turn of the twentieth century was the transfer of a vast amount of Mexican land in all parts of the country into foreign hands, either individuals or land companies. Along the northern border with the U.S., American investors were prominent, but they owned land along both coasts, across the Isthmus of Tehuantepec and central Mexico. Rural communities and small-scale farmers lost their holdings and were forced to be agricultural wage laborers or pursue or move. Conditions on haciendas were often harsh. Landlessness caused rural discontent and a major cause of peasant participation in the Mexican Revolution, seeking a reversal of the concentration of land ownership through land reform.

For elites, "it was the golden age of Mexican economics, 3.2 dollars per peso." Following his personal interview with Díaz, James Creelman relates in his 1908 Pearson magazine article that "conditions for investment in Mexico are fairer and quite as reliable as in the most highly developed European countries" such as France, Great Britain, and Germany. For some Mexicans, there was no money, and the doors were thrown open to those who had." Economic progress varied drastically from region to region. The north was defined by mining and ranching while the central valley became the home of large-scale farms for wheat and grain and large industrial centers.

One component of economic growth involved stimulating foreign investment in the Mexican mining sector. Through tax waivers and other incentives, investment and growth were effectively realized. The secluded southern Baja California region benefited from the establishment of an economic zone with the founding of the town of Santa Rosalía and the prosperous development of the El Boleo copper mine. This came about when Díaz granted a French mining company a 70-year tax waiver in return for its substantial investment in the project. Similarly, the city of Guanajuato realized substantial foreign investment in local silver mining ventures. The city subsequently experienced a period of prosperity, symbolized by the construction of numerous landmark buildings, most notably, the magnificent Juárez Theatre. By 1900 over 90% of the communal land of the Central Plateau had been sold off or expropriated, forcing 9.5 million peasants off the land and into the service of big landowners.

Because Díaz had created such an effective centralized government, he was able to concentrate decision-making and maintain control over the economic instability. This instability arose largely as a result of the dispossession of hundreds of thousands of peasants of their land. Communal Indigenous landholdings were privatized, subdivided, and sold. The Porfiriato thus generated a stark contrast between rapid economic growth and sudden, severe impoverishment of the rural masses, a situation that was to explode in the Mexican Revolution of 1910.

During 1883–1894, laws were passed to give fewer and fewer people large amounts of land, which was taken away from people by bribing local judges to declare it vacant or unoccupied (terrenos baldíos). A friend of Díaz obtained 12 million acres of land in Baja California by bribing local judges. Those who opposed were killed or captured and sold as slaves to plantations. The manufacture of cheap alcohol increased prompting the number of bars in Mexico City to rise from 51 in 1864 to 1,400 in 1900. This caused the rate of death from alcoholism and alcohol-related accidents to rise to levels higher than anywhere else in the world.

One location affected by Diaz's new laws and the privatization of communal Indigenous lands was the town of Papantla. This was a town that had become famous for growing a majority of the vanilla that heavily benefited Mexico's economy. Many of the local Totonac revolted after they were phased out the condueñazgo, a type of land distribution where individuals could co-own land and buy shares of property and its profits. The new land privatization efforts stripped shareholders of ownership, causing violence and rebellions against Mexican elites. Some Totonac peoples made efforts to legally regain their land, sending many formal dissents to the government. Diaz intervened numerous times stating, "I have been informed...that the subdivision of Papantla's lands is a very difficult thing, and that it is provoking much irritation." These laws ultimately ended traditional views of communal landownership and restructured the social hierarchy in the region.

== Cracks in the political system ==
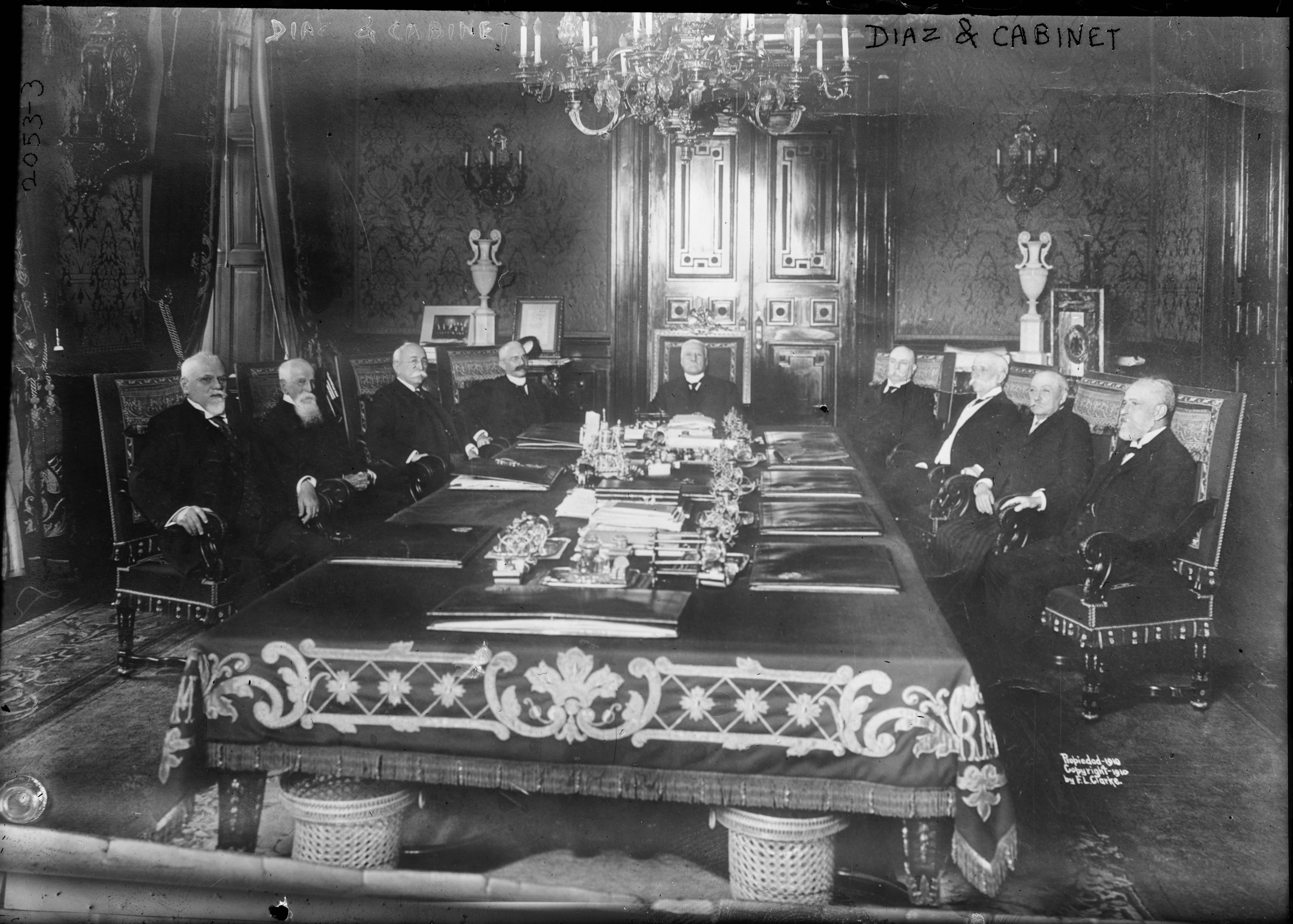
Díaz's cabinet in his later years and theirs

Díaz has been characterized as a "republican monarch and his regime a synthesis of pragmatic [colonial-era] Bourbon methods and Liberal republican ideals.... As much by longevity as by design, Díaz came to embody the nation." Díaz did not plan well for the transition to a regime other than his own. As Díaz aged and continued to be re-elected, the question of presidential succession became more urgent. Political aspirants within his regime envisioned succeeding to the presidency and opponents began organizing in anticipation of Díaz's exit.

In 1898, the Díaz regime faced several important issues, with the death of Matías Romero, Díaz's long-time political adviser who had made great efforts to strengthen Mexico's ties with the U.S. since the Juárez regime, and a major shift in U.S. foreign policy toward imperialism with its success in the Spanish–American War. Romero's death created new dynamics amongst the three political groups that Díaz both relied upon and manipulated. Romero's faction had strongly supported U.S. investment in Mexico, and was largely pro-American, but with Romero's death, his faction declined in power. The other two factions were José Yves Limantour's Científicos and Bernardo Reyes's followers, the Reyistas. Limantour pursued a policy of offsetting U.S. influence by favoring European investment, especially British banking houses and entrepreneurs, such as Weetman Pearson. U.S. investment in Mexico remained robust and even grew, but the economic climate was more hostile to their interests and their support for the regime declined.

The U.S. had asserted that it had the preeminent role in the Western hemisphere, with U.S. President Theodore Roosevelt modifying the Monroe Doctrine via the Roosevelt Corollary, which declared that the U.S. could intervene in other countries' political affairs if the U.S. determined they were not well run. Díaz pushed back against this policy, saying that the security of the hemisphere was a collective enterprise of all its nations. There was a meeting of American states, in the second Pan-American Conference, which met in Mexico City from 22 October 1901 – 31 January 1902, and the U.S. backed off from its hard-line policy of interventionism, at least for the moment regarding Mexico.

In domestic politics, Bernardo Reyes became increasingly powerful, and Díaz appointed him Minister of War. The Mexican Federal Army was becoming increasingly ineffective. With wars being waged against the Yaqui in northwest Mexico and the Maya, Reyes requested and received increased funding to augment the number of men at arms.

There was some open opposition to Díaz's regime, with eccentric lawyer Nicolás Zúñiga y Miranda running against Díaz. Zúñiga lost every election but always claimed fraud and considered himself to be the legitimately elected president, but he did not mount a serious challenge to the regime. More importantly, as the 1910 election approached and Díaz stated he would not run for re-election, Limantour and Reyes vied against each other for favor.

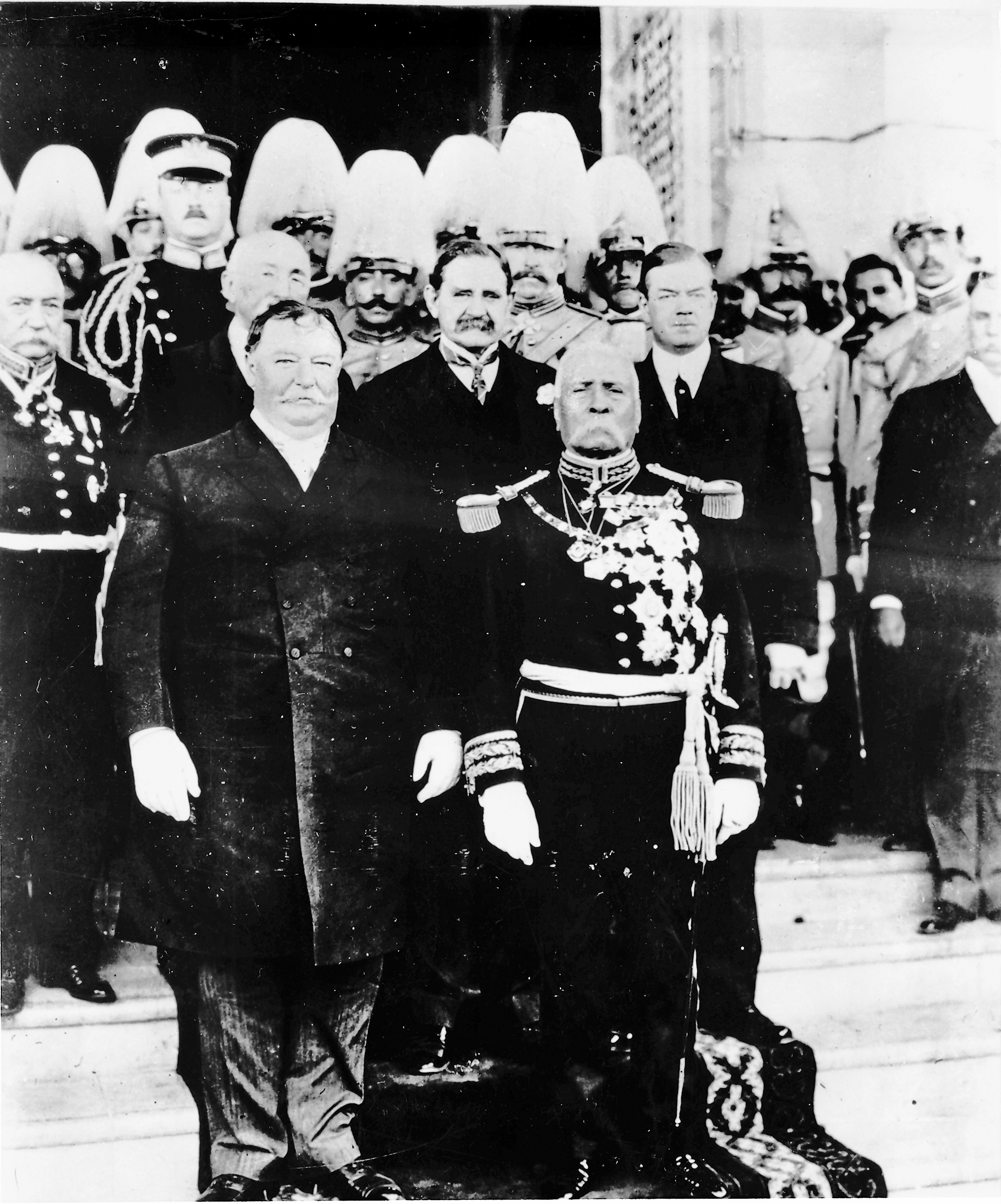
Presidents Taft and Díaz at historic summit in Juárez, Mexico, 1909

On 17 February 1908, in an interview with the U.S. journalist James Creelman of Pearson's Magazine, Díaz stated that Mexico was ready for democracy and elections and that he would retire and allow other candidates to compete for the presidency. Without hesitation, several opposition and pro-government groups united to find suitable candidates who would represent them in the upcoming presidential elections. Many liberals formed clubs supporting Bernardo Reyes, then the governor of Nuevo León, as a candidate. Even though Reyes never formally announced his candidacy, Díaz continued to perceive him as a threat and sent him on a mission to Europe, so that he was not in the country for the elections.

In 1909, Díaz and William Howard Taft, the then president of the United States, planned a summit in El Paso, Texas, and Ciudad Juárez, Chihuahua, Mexico, a historic first meeting between a U.S. president and a Mexican president and also the first time an American president would cross the border into Mexico. Officially, the summit meeting was organized to strengthen ties of cooperation, mutual assistance, understanding, and collaboration. Díaz requested the meeting to show U.S. support for his planned seventh run as president, and Taft agreed to protect the several billion dollars of American capital then invested in Mexico. After nearly 30 years with Díaz in power, U.S. businesses controlled "nearly 90 percent of Mexico's mineral resources, its national railroad, its oil industry and, increasingly, its land." Both sides agreed that the disputed Chamizal strip connecting El Paso to Ciudad Juárez would be considered neutral territory with no flags present during the summit, but the meeting focused attention on this territory and resulted in assassination threats and other serious security concerns. The Texas Rangers, 4,000 U.S. and Mexican troops, U.S. Secret Service agents, FBI agents, and U.S. marshals were all called in to provide security. An additional 250-man private security detail led by Frederick Russell Burnham, the celebrated scout, was hired by John Hays Hammond, a close friend of Taft from Yale and a former candidate for U.S. vice president in 1908 who, along with his business partner Burnham, held considerable mining interests in Mexico. On 16 October, the day of the summit, Burnham and Private C.R. Moore, a Texas Ranger, discovered a man holding a concealed palm pistol standing at the El Paso Chamber of Commerce building along the procession route. Burnham and Moore captured and disarmed the assassin within only a few feet of Díaz and Taft.

== 1910 Centennial of Independence ==
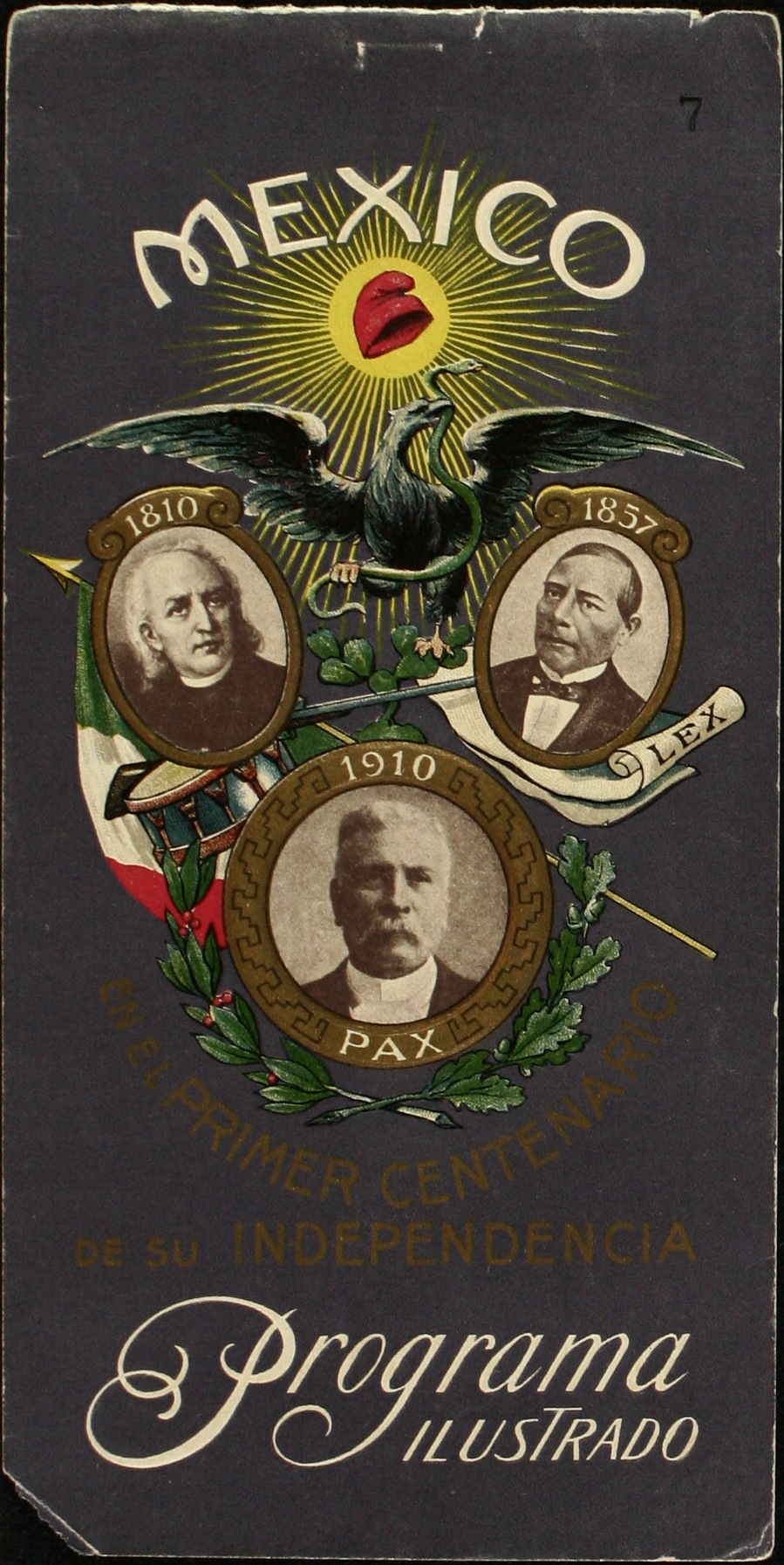
Illustrated program of the official centennial festivities over 30 days in September 1910

The year 1910 was important in Mexico's history—the centennial of the revolt by Miguel Hidalgo, seen as the beginning of the Mexican War of independence. On the cover of the official program for the centennial, three figures are shown: Hidalgo, father of independence; Benito Juárez, with the label "Lex" (law); and Porfirio Díaz, with the label "Pax" (peace). Also on the cover are the emblem of Mexico and the cap of liberty. Díaz inaugurated the monument to Independence with its golden angel during the September centennial celebrations. Although Díaz and Juárez had been political rivals after the French Intervention, Díaz had done much to promote the legacy of his dead rival and had a large monument to Juárez built by the Alameda Park, which Díaz inaugurated during the centennial. A work published in 1910 details the day-by-day events of the September festivities.

== 1910 election and ousting ==
As groups began to settle on their presidential candidate, Díaz decided that he was not going to retire but rather allow Francisco I. Madero, an elite but democratically leaning reformer, to run against him. Although Madero, a landowner, was very similar to Díaz in his ideology, he hoped for other elites in Mexico to rule alongside the president. Ultimately, however, Díaz did not approve of Madero and had him jailed during the 1910 election.

The election went ahead. Madero had gathered much popular support, but when the government announced the official results, Díaz was proclaimed to have been re-elected almost unanimously, with Madero said to have attained a minuscule number of votes. This case of massive electoral fraud aroused widespread anger throughout the Mexican citizenry. Madero called for revolt against Díaz in the Plan of San Luis Potosí, and the violence to oust Díaz is now seen as the first phase of the Mexican Revolution. Rebellions in many different places stretched the Federal Army's and the Rurales's ability to suppress them all, revealing the regime's weakness. Díaz was forced to resign from office on 25 May 1911 and left the country for Spain six days later, on 31 May 1911.

== Later days in exile and death ==
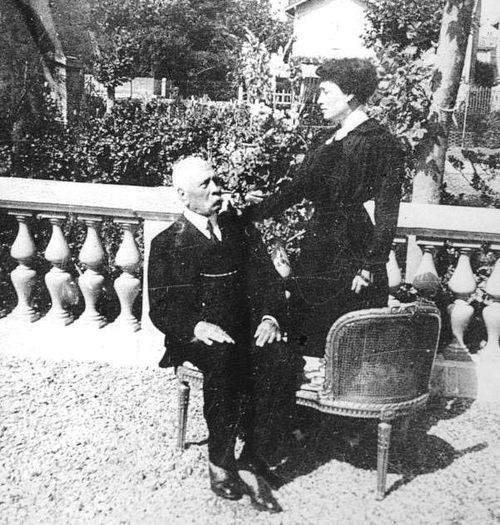
Don Porfirio and Doña Carmen in exile in Paris, c. 1912

Díaz kept his brother's son Félix Díaz away from political or military power. He did, however, allow his nephew to enrich himself. It was only after Díaz went into exile in 1911 that his nephew became prominent in politics, as the embodiment of the old regime. Even so, Díaz's assessment of his nephew proved astute since Félix never successfully led troops or garnered sustained support, and was forced into exile several times.

On 2 July 1915, Díaz died of heart failure in exile in Paris, France at the age of 84. He was buried in the Cimetière du Montparnasse. His other children died as infants or young children. His widow Carmen and his son were allowed to return to Mexico.

== Personal life ==
Díaz came from a devoutly Catholic family; his relative, José Agustín Domínguez y Diaz, was bishop of Oaxaca. Díaz had trained for the priesthood, and it seemed likely that was his career path. Oaxaca was a center of liberalism, and the founding of the Institute of Arts and Sciences, a secular institution, helped foster professional training for Oaxacan liberals, including Benito Juárez and Porfirio Díaz. When Díaz abandoned his ecclesiastical career for one in the military, his powerful uncle disowned him.

In Díaz's personal life, it is clear that religion still mattered and that fierce anti-clericalism could have a high price. In 1870, his brother Félix, a fellow liberal, who was then governor of Oaxaca, had rigorously applied the anti-clerical laws of the Reform. In the rebellious and supposedly idolatrous town of Juchitán in Tehuantepec, Félix Díaz had "roped the image of the patron saint of Juchitán … to his horse and dragged it away, returning the saint days later with its feet cut off". When Félix had to flee Oaxaca City in 1871 following Porfirio's failed coup against Juárez, Félix ended up in Juchitán, where the villagers killed him, doing to his body even worse than he did to their saint. Having lost a brother to the fury of religious peasants, Díaz had a cautionary tale about the dangers of enforcing anti-clericalism. Even so, it is clear that Díaz wanted to remain in good standing with the Church.

Díaz married his niece Delfina Ortega Díaz (1845–1880), the daughter of his sister, Manuela Josefa Díaz Mori (1824–1856). Díaz and she would have seven children, with Delfina dying due to complications of her seventh delivery. Following her death, he wrote a private letter to Church officials renouncing the Laws of the Reform, which allowed his wife to be buried with Catholic rites in sacred ground.

Díaz had a relationship with a soldadera, Rafaela Quiñones, during the war of the French Intervention, which resulted in the birth of Amada Díaz (1867–1962), whom he recognized. Amada went to live in Díaz's home with his wife Delfina. Amada married Ignacio de la Torre y Mier, but the couple had no children. De la Torre was said to have been present at the 1901 Dance of the Forty-One, a gathering of gay men and cross-dressers that was raided by police. The report that de la Torre was there was neither confirmed nor denied, but the dance was a huge scandal at the time, satirized by caricaturist José Guadalupe Posada.

Díaz remarried in 1881, to Carmen Romero Rubio, the pious 17-year-old daughter of his most important advisor, Manuel Romero Rubio. Oaxaca cleric Father Eulogio Gillow y Zavala gave his blessing. Gillow was later appointed archbishop of Oaxaca. Doña Carmen is credited with bringing Díaz into closer reconciliation with the Church, but Díaz was already inclined in that direction. The marriage produced no children, but Díaz's surviving children lived with the couple until adulthood.

In 1938, the 430-piece collection of arms of the late General Porfirio Díaz was donated to the Royal Military College of Canada in Kingston, Ontario.

Although Díaz is criticized on many grounds, he did not create a family dynasty. His only son to survive to adulthood, Porfirio Díaz Ortega, known as "Porfirito", trained to be an officer at the military academy. He graduated as a military engineer and never served in combat. He and his family went into European exile after Díaz's resignation. They were allowed to return to Mexico during the amnesty of Lázaro Cárdenas.

== Legacy ==
The legacy of Díaz has undergone revision since the 1990s. In Díaz's lifetime before his ouster, there was adulatory literature, which has been named "Porfirismo". He maintained an international reputation as the statesman that had finally brought stability to Mexico.

The vast literature that characterizes him as a tyrant and dictator has its origins in the late period of Díaz's rule and has continued to shape Díaz's historical image. In recent years, however, there has been an effort to rehabilitate Díaz's figure, most prominently by television personality and historian Enrique Krauze, in what has been termed "Neo-Porfirismo". As Mexico pursued a neoliberal path under President Carlos Salinas de Gortari, the policies of Díaz that opened Mexico up to foreign investment fit with the turn of the Institutional Revolutionary Party toward privatization of state companies and market-oriented reforms. Díaz was characterized as a far more benign figure for these revisionists.

Díaz is usually credited with the saying, "¡Pobre México! ¡Tan lejos de Dios y tan cerca de los Estados Unidos!" (Poor Mexico, so far from God and so close to the United States!).

Partly due to Díaz's lengthy tenure, the current Mexican constitution limits a president to a single six-year term with no possibility of re-election, even if it is nonconsecutive. Additionally, no one who holds the post, even on a caretaker basis, is allowed to run or serve again. This provision is so entrenched that it remained in place even after legislators were allowed to run for a second consecutive term.

There have been several attempts to return Díaz's remains to Mexico since the 1920s. The most recent movement started in 2014 in Oaxaca by the Comisión Especial de los Festejos del Centenario Luctuoso de Porfirio Díaz Mori, which is headed by Francisco Jiménez. According to some, the fact that Díaz's remains have not been returned to Mexico "symbolizes the failure of the post-Revolutionary state to come to terms with the legacy of the Díaz regime."

== Honors ==
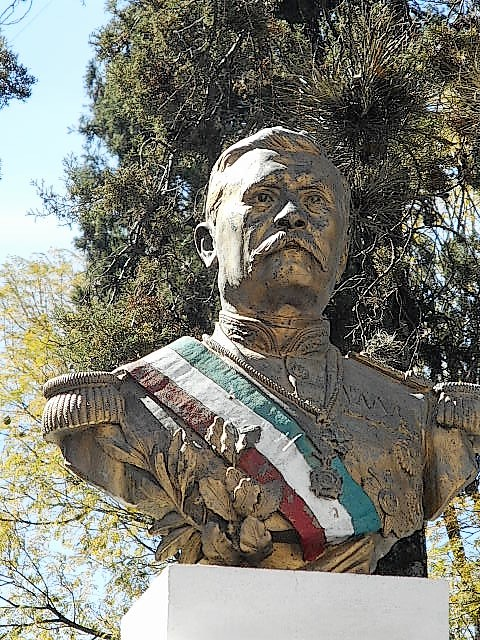
Bust of Porfirio Díaz in Tlaxiaco, Oaxaca, Mexico, 2018

List of notable foreign awards awarded to President Díaz:

Country	Awards
Austria-Hungary	Grand Cross of the Royal Hungarian Order of St. Stephen
Belgium	Grand Cordon of the Order of Leopold
China's Qing Dynasty	First Class Condecoration of the Imperial Order of the Double Dragon
France	Napoleon's Austerlitz sword Grand Cross of the Legion of Honour
Kingdom of Italy	Knight of the Grand Cross of the Order of Saints Maurice and Lazarus
Empire of Japan	Grand Cordon of the Order of the Chrysanthemum
Netherlands	Knight Grand Cross of the Order of the Netherlands Lion
Persia's Qajar dynasty	First Class Condecoration with Grand Cordon of the Order of the Lion and the Sun
Kingdom of Prussia	Grand Cross of the Order of the Red Eagle
Kingdom of Portugal	Grand Cross of the Order of the Tower and Sword
Russian Empire	Star of the Imperial Order of St. Alexander Nevsky
Spain	Grand Cross of the Order of Isabella the Catholic; Grand Cross of the Order of Military Merit
Sweden	Commander Grand Cross of the Order of the Sword
United Kingdom	Honorary Knight Grand Cross of the Most Honourable Order of the Bath
Venezuela	First Class of the Order of the Liberator
Kingdom of Hawaii	Grand Cross of the Royal Order of Kalākaua I

== See also ==
- List of heads of state of Mexico
- Mexican Revolution
- 1884 in Mexico
- Porfirionism
- Porfiriato
- Emiliano Zapata
- History of Mexico
- Second French intervention in Mexico
- Freemasonry in Mexico
- Francisco I. Madero
- Reform War
- Attack against Porfirio Díaz of 1897

== Notes ==
Political offices
Preceded by José María Iglesias	President of Mexico; 28 November – 6 December 1876	Succeeded by Juan N. Méndez
Preceded by Juan N. Méndez	President of Mexico; 17 February 1877 – 1 December 1880	Succeeded by Manuel González Flores
Preceded by Manuel González Flores	President of Mexico; 1 December 1884 – 25 May 1911	Succeeded by Francisco León de la Barra
