= 1877 Mexican presidential election =

- 12 February 1877
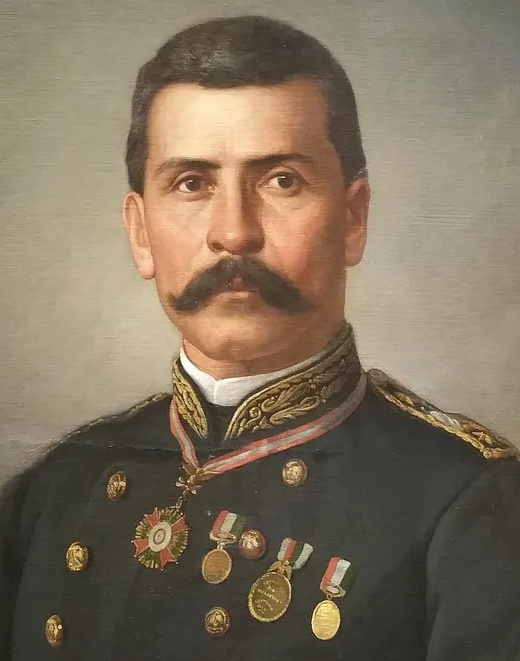
Nominee	Porfirio Díaz
Popular vote	11,475
Percentage	96.40%
President before election
Juan N. Méndez
Elected President
Porfirio Díaz

Presidential elections were held in Mexico on 12 February 1877. They followed the overthrow of President Sebastián Lerdo de Tejada at the end of 1876 as part of the Plan of Tuxtepec. The result was a victory for Porfirio Díaz, who received 96.4% of the vote. This marked the beginning of Díaz's long rule, known as the Porfiriato.

Following Lerdo's 1876 reelection, Díaz launched the Tuxtepec Revolution and successfully overthrew him. Díaz briefly assumed the presidency, but stepped down to combat an uprising, making his ally Juan N. Méndez president. Méndez scheduled new elections in according with the Plan of Tuxtepec, although elections were not held in Baja California, Chihuahua, and Sonora.

Díaz was the frontrunner due to his leadership of the Tuxtepec Revolution, and he did not campaign. Minor candidates other than Díaz did receive some votes, but the Chamber of Deputies counted those as blank votes. Díaz was inaugurated later that year and would serve until 1880, being reelected in 1884 and staying in office until his overthrow in 1911 during the Mexican Revolution.

== Background ==
Porfirio Díaz was a Mexican army general born in Oaxaca, Oaxaca. He supported Mexico's Liberals during the Reform War and played in a large role in the Liberal victory during the second French intervention in Mexico. He lost the 1867 presidential election to incumbent Liberal president Benito Juárez. He ran again in the 1871 election against Juárez and Sebastián Lerdo de Tejada. Juárez was declared the winner. Díaz and his supporters denounced the reelection as fraudulent and proclaimed the Plan de la Noria to oust Juárez. Juárez died in 1872, and Lerdo, as president of the Supreme Court, became president. Lerdo issued an amnesty to end the conflict and defeated Díaz in the election held that year.

Díaz proclaimed the Plan of Tuxtepec in 1876 to oust Lerdo following the latter's reelection that year. The Tuxtepec Revolution successfully overthrew Lerdo, and Díaz became de facto president on 28 November. Article 5 of the plan included a call to the Mexican people for new presidential elections. Díaz subsequently stepped down on 6 December to combat an uprising by José María Iglesias, leaving his ally Juan N. Méndez as interim president. The elections would be held under Méndez.

== Campaign and conduct ==
On 23 December, new elections were announced, though Lerdistas (supporters of Lerdo) were excluded. Primary elections for municipal authorities were held to replace Lerdistas on 21 January, with secondary elections held on 4 February and the municipal authorities taking office the following day. Presidential primary elections were held on 28 January. According to historian María Eugenia Ponce Alcocer, Díaz was the obvious presidential candidate due to him leading the Tuxtepec Revolution, and he did not need to campaign, but instead to negotiate with regional elites. The newspaper El Monitor Republicano argued that the elections should have been delayed because ongoing violence in parts of the country might have resulted in an incomplete vote or no candidate receiving an absolute majority as mandated by the constitution. Having defeated Iglesias, Díaz returned to Mexico City on 11 February.

Mexico's 1857 constitution included provisions allowing the army to vote but mandated that soldiers had to stay in their barracks or at their posts beginning a month before election day. However, this rule was violated in certain areas. In Tampico, Tamaulipas, members of the Club Porfirio Díaz were attacked and imprisoned by soldiers. In Zimapán, Ixquimilpan, and Jacala in Hidalgo, soldiers appeared to pressure citizens over who to choose as electors.

== Results ==
Presidential elections were held on 12 February, though elections were not held in the states of Chihuahua and Sonora and the territory of Baja California. Candidates other than Díaz received votes in some areas. Miguel Negrete received some votes in Tacubaya, while Santiago Cuevas received 25 out of 73 votes cast in Jilotepec. However, in the vote count held by the Chamber of Deputies, which acted as an electoral college, votes not for Díaz were counted as blank. Díaz won, receiving 11,475 votes (96.4%), while blank votes totaled 428 (3.6%).

Candidate	Votes	%
Porfirio Díaz	11,475	96.40
Other candidates	428	3.60
Blank votes	428	3.60
Total	11,903	100.00
Source: Ramírez Rancaño, Ponce Alcocer

=== Results by state ===
State	Díaz	Others/blank
Aguascalientes	130	44
Baja California	0	0
Campeche	125	0
Chiapas	286	6
Chihuahua	0	0
Coahuila	113	1
Colima	82	1
Distrito Federal	427	9
Durango	83	0
Guanajuato	934	73
Guerrero	283	32
Hidalgo	684	1
Jalisco	1,028	22
Mexico	637	28
Michoacán	687	9
Morelos	236	2
Nuevo León	246	0
Oaxaca	1,092	9
Puebla	1,208	28
Querétaro	280	0
San Luis Potosí	866	7
Sinaloa	130	2
Sonora	0	0
Tabasco	118	0
Tamaulipas	94	0
Tlaxcala	140	0
Veracruz	711	2
Yucatán	418	0
Zacatecas	437	116
Total	11,475	428
Source: Ramírez Rancaño

== Aftermath ==
Díaz became de facto president again on 17 February, and constitutional president on 5 May. Díaz's victory marked the beginning of his long rule, the period of Mexican history commonly known as the Porfiriato, where Díaz ruled as a dictator. In line with the demands of the Plan of Tuxtepec, immediate presidential reelection was prohibited via a constitutional amendment in 1878 in according with the Plan of Tuxtepec. Díaz was succeeded by his ally Manuel González Flores in 1880 and Díaz was reelected in 1884. The right for immediate reelection was restored in 1887, and Díaz would remain in the position until his ousting in 1911 during the Mexican Revolution.
