= List of heads of state of Mexico =

The Head of State of Mexico is the person who controls the executive power in the country. Under the current constitution, this responsibility lies with the President of the United Mexican States, who is head of the supreme executive power of the Mexican Union. Throughout its history, Mexico has had several forms of government. Under the federal constitutions, the title of President was the same as the current one. Under the Seven Laws (centralist), the chief executive was named President of the Republic. In addition, there have been two periods of monarchical rule, during which the executive was controlled by the Emperor of Mexico.

The chronology of the heads of state of Mexico is complicated due to the country's political instability during most of the nineteenth century and early decades of the twentieth century. With few exceptions, most of the Mexican presidents elected during this period did not complete their terms. Until the presidency of Lázaro Cárdenas, each president remained in office an average of fifteen months.

This list also includes the self-appointed presidents during civil wars and the collegiate bodies that performed the executive duties during periods of transition.

== First Mexican Empire (1821–1823) ==
=== First Regency ===
After the end of the Mexican War of Independence, a Provisional Board of Governing consisting of thirty-four persons was set up. The Board decreed and signed the Declaration of Independence and appointed a regency composed of six people.

Members		Term of office		
Portrait	Name	Took office	Left office	Tenure
	Juan O'Donojú	28 September 1821	8 October 1821 (died)	10 days
	Agustín de Iturbide	28 September 1821	11 April 1822	195 days
	Manuel de la Bárcena	28 September 1821	11 April 1822	195 days
	José Isidro Yañez	28 September 1821	11 April 1822	195 days
	Manuel Velázquez de León	28 September 1821	11 April 1822	195 days
	Antonio Pérez Martínez	9 October 1821	11 April 1822	184 days

=== Second Regency ===
Members		Term of office		
Portrait	Name	Took office	Left office	Tenure
	Agustín de Iturbide	11 April 1822	18 May 1822	37 days
	José Isidro Yañez	11 April 1822	18 May 1822	37 days
	Miguel Valentín	11 April 1822	18 May 1822	37 days
	Manuel de Heras	11 April 1822	18 May 1822	37 days
	Nicolás Bravo	11 April 1822	18 May 1822	37 days

=== Monarchy of Agustín I ===
Portrait	Name (Birth–Death)	Reign			Royal house	Coat of arms
Portrait	Name (Birth–Death)	Reign start	Reign end	Duration	Royal house	Coat of arms
	Agustín I (1783–1824)	19 May 1822	19 March 1823	304 days	Iturbide	

== Provisional Government (1823–1824) ==
The Provisional Government of 1823–1824 was an organization that served as the Executive in the government of Mexico after the abdication of Agustín I, monarch of the Mexican Empire in 1823. The provisional government was responsible for convening the body that created the Federal Republic and existed from 1 April 1823 to 10 October 1824.

Head of State		Term of office		
Portrait	Name	Took office	Left office	Tenure
	Nicolás Bravo	31 March 1823	10 October 1824	1 year, 193 days
	Guadalupe Victoria	31 March 1823	10 October 1824	1 year, 193 days
	Pedro Celestino Negrete	31 March 1823	10 October 1824	1 year, 193 days
	José Mariano Michelena	1 April 1823	10 October 1824	1 year, 192 days
	Miguel Domínguez	1 April 1823	10 October 1824	1 year, 192 days
	Vicente Guerrero	1 April 1823	10 October 1824	1 year, 192 days

== First Federal Republic (1824–1835) ==
The president and vice president did not run jointly and could be from different parties.

No.	Portrait	Name (Birth–Death)	Term of office			Political party	Vice President	Notes
No.	Portrait	Name (Birth–Death)	Took office	Left office	Tenure	Political party	Vice President	Notes
1		Guadalupe Victoria (1786–1843)	10 October 1824	31 March 1829	4 years, 172 days	Independent (affiliated with the Liberal Party)	Nicolás Bravo (1824–1827)	First constitutionally elected President of Mexico, and the only President who completed his full term in almost 30 years of independent Mexico.
2		Vicente Guerrero (1782–1831)	1 April 1829	17 December 1829	260 days	Liberal Party	Anastasio Bustamante	He was appointed by Congress after the "resignation" of president-elect Manuel Gómez Pedraza.
3		José María Bocanegra (1787–1862)	17 December 1829	23 December 1829	6 days	Popular York Rite Party (part of the Liberal Party)	Anastasio Bustamante	He was appointed Interim President by Congress when Guerrero left office to fight the rebellion of his conservative Vice President Bustamante.
		Vélez–Quintanar–Alamán (Triumvirate)	23 December 1829	31 December 1829	8 days	Liberal Party (Vélez) Independent (Quintanar and Alamán)	Anastasio Bustamante	Pedro Vélez president of the Supreme Court, he was appointed by the Council of Government as head of the executive triumvirate along with Lucas Alamán and Luis Quintanar.
4		Anastasio Bustamante (1780–1853)	1 January 1830	13 August 1832	2 years, 225 days	Conservative Party	Himself	As Vice President he assumed the presidency after the conservative coup against Guerrero.
5		Melchor Múzquiz (1788–1844)	14 August 1832	24 December 1832	132 days	Popular York Rite Party (part of the Liberal Party)	Anastasio Bustamante	He was appointed Interim President by Congress when Bustamante left office to fight the rebellion of Santa Anna.
6		Manuel Gómez Pedraza (1789–1851)	24 December 1832	31 March 1833	97 days	Federalist York Rite Party (part of the Liberal Party)	Vacant	He assumed the presidency to conclude the term he would have begun in 1829, had he not "resigned" prior to inauguration, as the winner of the elections of 1828.
7		Valentín Gómez Farías (1781–1858)	1 April 1833	16 May 1833	45 days	Liberal Party	Himself	As Vice President he assumed the presidency in place of Santa Anna, along with whom he was elected in the elections of 1833.
8		Antonio López de Santa Anna (1794–1876)	16 May 1833	3 June 1833	18 days	Liberal Party	Valentín Gómez Farías	He assumed the presidency as the constitutionally-elected president. He alternated in the presidency with Vice President Gómez Farías four more times until 24 April 1834.
(7)		Valentín Gómez Farías (1781–1858)	3 June 1833	18 June 1833	15 days	Liberal Party	Himself	
(8)		Antonio López de Santa Anna (1794–1876)	18 June 1833	5 July 1833	17 days	Liberal Party	Valentín Gómez Farías	
(7)		Valentín Gómez Farías (1781–1858)	5 July 1833	27 October 1833	114 days	Liberal Party	Himself	
(8)		Antonio López de Santa Anna (1794–1876)	27 October 1833	15 December 1833	49 days	Liberal Party	Valentín Gómez Farías	
(7)		Valentín Gómez Farías (1781–1858)	16 December 1833	24 April 1834	129 days	Liberal Party	Himself	He promoted several liberal reforms that led to the discontent of conservatives and the church. Santa Anna took office again aligned with conservatives; Gómez Farías went into exile.
(8)		Antonio López de Santa Anna (1794–1876)	24 April 1834	27 January 1835	278 days	Conservative Party	Valentín Gómez Farías	He cancelled the liberal reforms. On 27 January, the Sixth Constituent Congress dismissed Gómez Farías as Vice President.
9		Miguel Barragán (1789–1836)	28 January 1835	27 February 1836	1 year, 30 days	Conservative Party	Vacant	He was appointed Interim President by Congress when Santa Anna left office to fight the rebellion of Zacatecas. On 23 October, Congress enacted the Constitutional Basis, which voided the Constitution of 1824 and the federal system. He served both as the last president of the First Federal Republic and the first of the Centralist Republic.

== Centralist Republic (1835–1846) ==
No.	Portrait	Name (Birth–Death)	Term of office			Political party	Notes
No.	Portrait	Name (Birth–Death)	Took office	Left office	Tenure	Political party	Notes
9		Miguel Barragán (1789–1836)	28 January 1835	27 February 1836	1 year, 30 days	Conservative Party	He left office because of a serious illness. He died three days later.
10		José Justo Corro (1794–1864)	27 February 1836	19 April 1837	1 year, 51 days	Conservative Party	He was appointed Interim President by Congress to conclude the presidential term. During his term, he enacted the Seven Laws and Spain recognized the Independence of Mexico.
(4)		Anastasio Bustamante (1780–1853)	19 April 1837	18 March 1839	1 year, 333 days	Conservative Party	He took office as constitutional elected president. He was elected in the elections of 1837 for an eight years term.
(8)		Antonio López de Santa Anna (1794–1876)	18 March 1839	10 July 1839	114 days	Conservative Party	He was appointed interim president by the Supreme Conservative Power when Bustamante left office to fight federalist rebellions.
11		Nicolás Bravo (1786–1854)	11 July 1839	19 July 1839	8 days	Conservative Party	He was appointed substitute president when Santa Anna left office.
(4)		Anastasio Bustamante (1780–1853)	19 July 1839	22 September 1841	2 years, 65 days	Conservative Party	He reassumed the presidency.
12		Francisco Javier Echeverría (1797–1852)	22 September 1841	10 October 1841	18 days	Conservative Party	He was appointed interim president when Bustamante left office to fight a rebellion headed by Mariano Paredes y Arrillaga, Santa Anna, and Gabriel Valencia. He resigned after the triumph of the rebellion.
(8)		Antonio López de Santa Anna (1794–1876)	10 October 1841	26 October 1842	1 year, 16 days	Liberal Party	He was appointed provisional president by a Junta de Representantes de los Departamentos (Board of Representatives of the Departments).
(11)		Nicolás Bravo (1786–1854)	26 October 1842	4 March 1843	129 days	Conservative Party	He was appointed substitute president by Santa Anna when he left office.
(8)		Antonio López de Santa Anna (1794–1876)	4 March 1843	4 October 1843	214 days	Liberal Party	He reassumed the presidency as provisional president.
13		Valentín Canalizo (1794–1850)	4 October 1843	4 June 1844	244 days	Conservative Party	He was appointed interim president by Santa Anna when he left office.
(8)		Antonio López de Santa Anna (1794–1876)	4 June 1844	12 September 1844	100 days	Liberal Party	He reassumed the presidency after being elected constitutional president by Congress on 2 January 1844.
14		José Joaquín de Herrera (1792–1854)	12 September 1844	21 September 1844	9 days	Liberal Party	He was appointed substitute president by Congress to replace the interim president Valentin Canalizo.
(13)		Valentín Canalizo (1794–1850)	21 September 1844	6 December 1844	76 days	Conservative Party	He assumed the presidency as interim president.
(14)		José Joaquín de Herrera (1792–1854)	6 December 1844	30 December 1845	1 year, 24 days	Liberal Party	He was appointed interim, and after, constitutional president by Senate after Canalizo was arrested for trying to dissolve the Congress.
15		Mariano Paredes (1797–1849)	31 December 1845	28 July 1846	209 days	Conservative Party	He assumed office via a coup against De Herrera. On 12 June, he was appointed interim president.
15		Mariano Paredes (1797–1849)	31 December 1845	28 July 1846	209 days	Conservative Party	Vice President; Nicolás Bravo
(11)		Nicolás Bravo (1786–1854)	28 July 1846	4 August 1846	7 days	Conservative Party	He took office when Paredes left the presidency to fight the Americans in the Mexican–American War. He was deposed by a federalist rebellion led by Jose Mariano Salas and Valentin Gomez Farias.
16		José Mariano Salas (1797–1867)	5 August 1846	23 December 1846	140 days	Conservative Party	He assumed office as provisional president after the triumph of the federalist rebellion (Plan de la Ciudadela). He put in force the Constitution of 1824 on 22 August. He served both as last president of the Centralist Republic and first of the Second Federal Republic.

== Second Federal Republic (1846–1863) ==
No.	Portrait	Name (Birth–Death)	Term of office			Political party	Notes
No.	Portrait	Name (Birth–Death)	Took office	Left office	Tenure	Political party	Notes
16		José Mariano Salas (1797–1867)	5 August 1846	23 December 1846	140 days	Conservative Party	After he restored federalism, he called elections. Santa Anna won the election and was appointed interim president by Congress and Valentin Gomez Farias as vice president.
(7)		Valentín Gómez Farías (1781–1858)	23 December 1846	21 March 1847	88 days	Liberal Party	As vice president, he took office in place of Santa Anna, who was fighting the invading U.S. Army in the Mexican–American War.
(8)		Antonio López de Santa Anna (1794–1876)	21 March 1847	2 April 1847	12 days	Liberal Party	He took office as elected interim president.
(8)		Antonio López de Santa Anna (1794–1876)	21 March 1847	2 April 1847	12 days	Liberal Party	Vice President; Valentín Gómez Farías
17		Pedro María de Anaya (1794–1854)	2 April 1847	20 May 1847	48 days	Liberal Party	Santa Anna left office to fight in the Mexican–American War. Congress abolished the vice presidency and he was appointed as substitute president.
(8)		Antonio López de Santa Anna (1794–1876)	20 May 1847	15 September 1847	118 days	Liberal Party	He reassumed the presidency when De Anaya left office to fight in the Mexican–American War.
18		Manuel de la Peña y Peña (1789–1850)	16 September 1847	13 November 1847	58 days	Conservative Party	As president of the Supreme Court, he assumed the presidency after Santa Anna's resignation.
(17)		Pedro María de Anaya (1794–1854)	13 November 1847	8 January 1848	56 days	Liberal Party	He was appointed interim president by Congress when De la Peña y Peña left office in order to negotiate peace with the United States.
(18)		Manuel de la Peña y Peña (1789–1850)	8 January 1848	3 June 1848	147 days	Conservative Party	He reassumed office as provisional president when De Anaya resigned after refusing to give any land to the United States. During his term, he signed the Treaty of Guadalupe Hidalgo.
(14)		José Joaquín de Herrera (1792–1854)	3 June 1848	15 January 1851	2 years, 226 days	Liberal Party	He was the second president to finish his term and peacefully turned over the presidency to the winner of the elections of 1850, General Mariano Arista.
19		Mariano Arista (1802–1855)	15 January 1851	5 January 1853	1 year, 356 days	Liberal Party	He resigned when Congress refused to give him extraordinary powers to fight the rebellion of Plan del Hospicio, the goal of which was to bring Santa Anna once again to the presidency.
20		Juan Bautista Ceballos (1811–1859)	6 January 1853	7 February 1853	32 days	Liberal Party	As president of the Supreme Court, he was proposed by President Arista as his successor and confirmed the same day as interim president by Congress.
21		Manuel María Lombardini (1802–1853)	8 February 1853	20 April 1853	71 days	Conservative Party	He was appointed provisional president by Congress when Ceballos resigned because of the rebellion of Plan del Hospicio.
(8)		Antonio López de Santa Anna (1794–1876)	20 April 1853	5 August 1855	2 years, 107 days	Conservative Party	He swore as President but ruled as dictator. He called himself "Su Alteza Serenisima" (Serene Highness). The Mexican National Anthem was composed during his presidency.
22		Martín Carrera (1806–1871)	5 August 1855	12 September 1855	38 days	Conservative Party	He was appointed interim president after the triumph of the Plan of Ayutla but he took office until 15 August.
23		Rómulo Díaz de la Vega (1800–1877)	12 September 1855	3 October 1855	21 days	Conservative Party	He served as de facto president after Carrera's resignation.
24		Juan Álvarez (1790–1867)	4 October 1855	11 December 1855	68 days	Liberal Party	He was appointed interim president by a council integrated with one representative of each state after the triumph of the Revolution of Ayutla.
25		Ignacio Gregorio Comonfort de los Ríos (1812–1863)	11 December 1855	17 December 1857	2 years, 6 days	Liberal Party	He was appointed interim president by Juan Alvarez when he resigned. He became constitutional president on 1 December 1857.

=== Reform War 1858–1860 ===
There were two rival governments during the civil war of the Reform, which the liberals won.

==== President recognized by the Liberals ====
No.	Portrait	Name (Birth–Death)	Term of office			Political party	Notes
No.	Portrait	Name (Birth–Death)	Took office	Left office	Tenure	Political party	Notes
26		Benito Juárez (1806–1872)	18 December 1857	18 July 1872 (died)	14 years, 213 days	Liberal Party	As president of the Supreme Court, he became interim president after the self-coup of Ignacio Comonfort against the Constitution of 1857. He was arrested and freed by Comonfort. He established a liberal constitutional government on 18 January 1858. The struggle between the Liberal and Conservative forces is known as Reform War.

==== Presidents recognized by the Conservatives ====
No.	Portrait	Name (Birth–Death)	Term of office			Political party	Notes
No.	Portrait	Name (Birth–Death)	Took office	Left office	Tenure	Political party	Notes
(25)		Ignacio Gregorio Comonfort de los Ríos (1812–1863)	17 December 1857	21 January 1858	35 days	Liberal Party	After the declaration of Plan of Tacubaya, Congress declared that he was no longer president but he was recognized by conservatives as president with absolute powers.
27		Félix María Zuloaga (1813–1898)	11 January 1858	24 December 1858	347 days	Conservative Party	After disowning Comonfort, Zuloaga was appointed president by the Conservative Party.
28		Manuel Robles Pezuela (1817–1862)	24 December 1858	21 January 1859	28 days	Conservative Party	He assumed the conservative presidency with the support of the Plan de Navidad.
(16)		José Mariano Salas (1797–1867)	21 January 1859	2 February 1859	12 days	Conservative Party	He was restored to the presidency by counter-rebellion led by Miguel Miramón.
29		Miguel Miramón (1831–1867)	2 February 1859	13 August 1860	1 year, 193 days	Conservative Party	He assumed the conservative presidency as substitute when Zuloaga left office.
30		José Ignacio Pavón (1791–1866)	13 August 1860	15 August 1860	2 days	Conservative Party	As president of the Supreme Court of the conservative government, he took office for two days when Miramón left office.
(29)		Miguel Miramón (1831–1867)	15 August 1860	24 December 1860	131 days	Conservative Party	He took office as interim president of the conservative government after he was elected by a group of "Representatives of the States" who supported the conservatives. He was defeated at the Battle of Calpulalpan, resigned the presidency and fled the country.

== Second Mexican Empire (1863–1867) ==
=== Regency ===
On 22 June 1863, a "Superior Governing Board" was established. On 11 July, the Board became the Regency of the Empire.

Members		Term of office			Political party
Portrait	Name	Took office	Left office	Tenure	Political party
	Juan Nepomuceno Almonte	11 July 1863	10 April 1864	274 days	Conservative Party
	José Mariano Salas	11 July 1863	10 April 1864	274 days	Conservative Party
	Pelagio Antonio de Labastida	11 July 1863	17 November 1863	129 days	Conservative Party
	José Ignacio Pavón	11 July 1863	2 January 1864	175 days	Conservative Party
	Juan Bautista Ormaechea	17 November 1863	10 April 1864	145 days	Conservative Party

=== Monarchy of Maximilian I ===
Portrait	Name (Birth–Death)	Reign			Royal house	Coat of arms
Portrait	Name (Birth–Death)	Reign start	Reign ended	Duration	Royal house	Coat of arms
	Maximilian I (1832–1867)	10 April 1864	19 June 1867	3 years, 70 days	Habsburg-Lorraine	

== Restored Republic (1867–1876) ==
No.	Portrait	Name (Birth–Death)	Elected	Term of office			Political party	Notes
No.	Portrait	Name (Birth–Death)	Elected	Took office	Left office	Tenure	Political party	Notes
(26)		Benito Juárez (1806–1872)	—	18 December 1857	11 June 1861	14 years, 213 days	Liberal Party	The first term he was interim president during the Reform War. The second term resulted from his being appointed constitutional president by Congress after the elections of 1861. His constitutional period began on 1 December. The third term was an extension of the second, a consequence of the invasion. The fourth and fifth terms followed the triumph of the Republic.
(26)		Benito Juárez (1806–1872)	1861	11 June 1861	30 November 1865	14 years, 213 days	Liberal Party	The first term he was interim president during the Reform War. The second term resulted from his being appointed constitutional president by Congress after the elections of 1861. His constitutional period began on 1 December. The third term was an extension of the second, a consequence of the invasion. The fourth and fifth terms followed the triumph of the Republic.
(26)		Benito Juárez (1806–1872)	—	1 December 1865	30 November 1867	14 years, 213 days	Liberal Party	The first term he was interim president during the Reform War. The second term resulted from his being appointed constitutional president by Congress after the elections of 1861. His constitutional period began on 1 December. The third term was an extension of the second, a consequence of the invasion. The fourth and fifth terms followed the triumph of the Republic.
(26)		Benito Juárez (1806–1872)	1867	1 December 1867	30 November 1871	14 years, 213 days	Liberal Party	The first term he was interim president during the Reform War. The second term resulted from his being appointed constitutional president by Congress after the elections of 1861. His constitutional period began on 1 December. The third term was an extension of the second, a consequence of the invasion. The fourth and fifth terms followed the triumph of the Republic.
(26)		Benito Juárez (1806–1872)	1871	1 December 1871	18 July 1872	14 years, 213 days	Liberal Party	The first term he was interim president during the Reform War. The second term resulted from his being appointed constitutional president by Congress after the elections of 1861. His constitutional period began on 1 December. The third term was an extension of the second, a consequence of the invasion. The fourth and fifth terms followed the triumph of the Republic.
31		Sebastián Lerdo de Tejada (1823–1889)	—	19 July 1872	30 November 1872	4 years, 154 days	Liberal Party	As president of the Supreme Court, he became interim president after the death of Juarez. He was the winner of the extraordinary election of 1872 and became constitutional president. He was overthrown by the Revolution of Tuxtepec and left office ten days before the end of his constitutional term.
31		Sebastián Lerdo de Tejada (1823–1889)	1872	1 December 1872	20 November 1876	4 years, 154 days	Liberal Party	As president of the Supreme Court, he became interim president after the death of Juarez. He was the winner of the extraordinary election of 1872 and became constitutional president. He was overthrown by the Revolution of Tuxtepec and left office ten days before the end of his constitutional term.
32		José María Iglesias (1823–1891)	—	26 October 1876	28 November 1876	33 days	Liberal Party	As president of the Supreme Court, he voided, on grounds of fraud, the reelection of Lerdo de Tejada after Congress had declared this reelection valid, and then declared himself interim president. When Lerdo de Tejada went to exile on 20 November, he became constitutional interim president.

== Porfiriato (1876–1911) ==
No.	Portrait	Name (Birth–Death)	Elected	Term of office			Political party	Notes
No.	Portrait	Name (Birth–Death)	Elected	Took office	Left office	Tenure	Political party	Notes
33		Porfirio Díaz (1830–1915)	—	28 November 1876	6 December 1876	8 days	Liberal Party	He became provisional president when Iglesias went to exile.
34		Juan N. Méndez (1824–1894)	—	6 December 1876	17 February 1877	73 days	Liberal Party	He was appointed substitute president by Díaz when he left office to fight the supporters of Lerdo de Tejada.
(33)		Porfirio Díaz (1830–1915)	1877	17 February 1877	30 November 1880	3 years, 287 days	Liberal Party	He reassumed the presidency. On 5 May, he was appointed constitutional president by Congress.
35		Manuel González Flores (1833–1893)	1880	1 December 1880	30 November 1884	4 years	Liberal Party	He was the winner of the 1880 general election.
(33)		Porfirio Díaz (1830–1915)	1884	1 December 1884	25 May 1911	26 years, 175 days	National Porfirist Party; National Reelectionist Party	He was the winner of the general election in 1884, 1888, 1892, 1896, 1900, 1904 and 1910. He resigned during his 7th term after the triumph of the Mexican Revolution.
(33)		Porfirio Díaz (1830–1915)	1888	1 December 1884	25 May 1911	26 years, 175 days	National Porfirist Party; National Reelectionist Party	He was the winner of the general election in 1884, 1888, 1892, 1896, 1900, 1904 and 1910. He resigned during his 7th term after the triumph of the Mexican Revolution.
(33)		Porfirio Díaz (1830–1915)	1892	1 December 1884	25 May 1911	26 years, 175 days	National Porfirist Party; National Reelectionist Party	He was the winner of the general election in 1884, 1888, 1892, 1896, 1900, 1904 and 1910. He resigned during his 7th term after the triumph of the Mexican Revolution.
(33)		Porfirio Díaz (1830–1915)	1896	1 December 1884	25 May 1911	26 years, 175 days	National Porfirist Party; National Reelectionist Party	He was the winner of the general election in 1884, 1888, 1892, 1896, 1900, 1904 and 1910. He resigned during his 7th term after the triumph of the Mexican Revolution.
(33)		Porfirio Díaz (1830–1915)	1900	1 December 1884	25 May 1911	26 years, 175 days	National Porfirist Party; National Reelectionist Party	He was the winner of the general election in 1884, 1888, 1892, 1896, 1900, 1904 and 1910. He resigned during his 7th term after the triumph of the Mexican Revolution.
(33)		Porfirio Díaz (1830–1915)	1904	1 December 1884	25 May 1911	26 years, 175 days	National Porfirist Party; National Reelectionist Party	Vice President; Ramón Corral (since 1904)
(33)		Porfirio Díaz (1830–1915)	1910	1 December 1884	25 May 1911	26 years, 175 days	National Porfirist Party; National Reelectionist Party	Vice President; Ramón Corral (since 1904)

== Revolution (1911–1928) ==
Political parties

Progressive Constitutionalist Party
Independent

No.	Portrait	Name (Birth–Death)	Elected	Term of office			Political party	Notes
No.	Portrait	Name (Birth–Death)	Elected	Took office	Left office	Tenure	Political party	Notes
36		Francisco León de la Barra (1863–1939)	—	25 May 1911	5 November 1911	164 days	Independent	According to the Treaty of Ciudad Juárez, he assumed office as interim president. Immediately called for elections.
37		Francisco I. Madero (1873–1913)	1911	6 November 1911	19 February 1913	1 year, 95 days	Progressive Constitutionalist Party	He was the winner of the 1911 general election. He was overthrown by a coup known as the Ten Tragic Days organized by Victoriano Huerta, Félix Díaz and the U.S. ambassador Henry L. Wilson. He was murdered three days later along with the vice president Pino Suárez.
37		Francisco I. Madero (1873–1913)	1911	6 November 1911	19 February 1913	1 year, 95 days	Progressive Constitutionalist Party	Vice President; José María Pino Suárez
38		Pedro Lascuráin (1856–1952)	—	19 February 1913		About 45 minutes	Progressive Constitutionalist Party	As Secretary of Foreign Affairs, he assumed office as interim president according to the constitution. In about 45 minutes, he appointed Victoriano Huerta as Secretary of the Interior and then resigned the Presidency.
39		Victoriano Huerta (1850–1916)	—	19 February 1913	15 July 1914	1 year, 146 days	Independent	He assumed office via a coup against Francisco I. Madero. He was defeated by the Constitutional Army led by Governor of Coahuila, Venustiano Carranza.
40		Francisco S. Carvajal (1870–1932)	—	15 July 1914	13 August 1914	29 days	Independent	He assumed office as Interim President after the resignation of Huerta. He resigned after the signing of the Teoloyucan Treaties.

=== Presidents recognized by the Convention of Aguascalientes ===
The Conventionists were followers of revolutionary generals Pancho Villa and Emiliano Zapata. They fought a civil war with the followers of revolutionaries under Venustiano Carranza.

No.	Portrait	Name (Birth–Death)	Term of office			Notes
No.	Portrait	Name (Birth–Death)	Took office	Left office	Tenure	Notes
41		Eulalio Gutiérrez (1881–1939)	6 November 1914	16 January 1915	71 days	He was appointed provisional president.
42		Roque González Garza (1885–1962)	16 January 1915	10 June 1915	145 days	He was appointed provisional president after Gutierrez left Mexico City.
43		Francisco Lagos Cházaro (1878–1932)	10 June 1915	10 October 1915	122 days	He assumed office as provisional president when González Garza resigned.

=== Constitutionalist victory and restoration of democracy ===
The revolutionary Constitutionalist Army under the authority "First Chief" Venustiano Carranza defeated the Army of the Convention in 1915, with a new constitution drafted in 1916–17.

Political parties

Liberal Constitutionalist Party
Laborist Party

No.	Portrait	Name (Birth–Death)	Elected	Term of office			Political party	Notes
No.	Portrait	Name (Birth–Death)	Elected	Took office	Left office	Tenure	Political party	Notes
44		Venustiano Carranza (1859–1920)	—	Head of the Executive Power; First Chief of the Constitutional Army		2 years, 260 days	Liberal Constitutionalist Party	He served as Head of the Executive Power after the resignation of Carvajal. He did not immediately call for presidential elections, which he had promised under the Plan of Guadalupe but ruled as the "pre-constitutional" head of government. He convoked a Constituent Convention which enacted the Political Constitution of the United Mexican States. He won the 1917 general election and took office as Constitutional President on 1 May 1917. He died during the Rebellion of Agua Prieta, led by three revolutionary generals.
44		Venustiano Carranza (1859–1920)	—	13 August 1914	30 April 1917	2 years, 260 days	Liberal Constitutionalist Party	
44		Venustiano Carranza (1859–1920)	1917	President of Mexico		3 years, 20 days	Liberal Constitutionalist Party	
44		Venustiano Carranza (1859–1920)	1917	1 May 1917	21 May 1920	3 years, 20 days	Liberal Constitutionalist Party	
45		Adolfo de la Huerta (1881–1955)	—	1 June 1920	30 November 1920	182 days	Liberal Constitutionalist Party	He was one of the leaders of the coup against Carranza, who had attempted to impose a civilian successor in 1920. De la Huerta was appointed provisional president by Congress.
46		Álvaro Obregón (1880–1928)	1920	1 December 1920	30 November 1924	4 years	Laborist Party	He was the most successful general of the Constitutionalist Army and joined the rebellion against Carranza. When elections were held in the aftermath of the coup, he was the winner of the 1920 general election. Obregón designated Plutarco Elías Calles as his successor; fellow Sonoran general Adolfo de la Huerta rebelled with considerable revolutionary army support, but Obregón crushed the rebellion.
47		Plutarco Elías Calles (1877–1945)	1924	1 December 1924	30 November 1928	4 years	Laborist Party	He was the winner of the 1924 general election. He changed the constitution to allow non-consecutive election of a president, allowing Obregón to run again in 1928. Obregón was re-elected but was assassinated before being sworn in. Calles then founded the political party that managed presidential succession until 2000.

== Maximato (1928–1934) ==
President-elect Obregón was assassinated before he was inaugurated for a six-year presidential term. Calles brought together revolutionaries to found the National Revolutionary Party (now the Institutional Revolutionary Party (PRI)). Calles could not succeed himself as president, but he remained the power behind the presidency as the jefe máximo (maximum chief).

Political parties

Laborist Party
National Revolutionary Party

No.	Portrait	Name (Birth–Death)	Elected	Term of office			Political party	Notes
No.	Portrait	Name (Birth–Death)	Elected	Took office	Left office	Tenure	Political party	Notes
48		Emilio Portes Gil (1890–1978)	—	1 December 1928	4 February 1930	1 year, 65 days	Laborist Party	He was appointed interim president by Congress, after the assassination of the winner of the 1928 general election, president-elect Álvaro Obregón.
49		Pascual Ortiz Rubio (1877–1963)	1929	5 February 1930	2 September 1932	2 years, 210 days	National Revolutionary Party	He was the winner of the 1929 general election. He resigned due to the intervention of Calles in his government.
50		Abelardo L. Rodríguez (1889–1967)	—	4 September 1932	30 November 1934	2 years, 87 days	National Revolutionary Party	He was appointed substitute president by Congress to conclude the 1928–1934 term.

== Modern Mexico (1934–present) ==
After the constitutional reform of 1926, the presidential term in Mexico was extended to six years starting in 1928; with a formal ban on reelection. After the 1934 general election, all the presidents have completed their six-year terms.

Political parties

Institutional Revolutionary Party
National Action Party
National Regeneration Movement

No.	Portrait	Name (Birth–Death)	Elected	Term of office			Political party
No.	Portrait	Name (Birth–Death)	Elected	Took office	Left office	Tenure	Political party
51		Lázaro Cárdenas del Río (1895–1970)	1934	1 December 1934	30 November 1940	6 years	National Revolutionary Party
52		Manuel Ávila Camacho (1897–1955)	1940	1 December 1940	30 November 1946	6 years	Party of the Mexican Revolution
53		Miguel Alemán Valdés (1900–1983)	1946	1 December 1946	30 November 1952	6 years	Institutional Revolutionary Party
54		Adolfo Ruiz Cortines (1889–1973)	1952	1 December 1952	30 November 1958	6 years	Institutional Revolutionary Party
55		Adolfo López Mateos (1909–1969)	1958	1 December 1958	30 November 1964	6 years	Institutional Revolutionary Party
56		Gustavo Díaz Ordaz (1911–1979)	1964	1 December 1964	30 November 1970	6 years	Institutional Revolutionary Party
57		Luis Echeverría Álvarez (1922–2022)	1970	1 December 1970	30 November 1976	6 years	Institutional Revolutionary Party
58		José López Portillo (1920–2004)	1976	1 December 1976	30 November 1982	6 years	Institutional Revolutionary Party
59		Miguel de la Madrid Hurtado (1934–2012)	1982	1 December 1982	30 November 1988	6 years	Institutional Revolutionary Party
60		Carlos Salinas de Gortari (born 1948)	1988	1 December 1988	30 November 1994	6 years	Institutional Revolutionary Party
61		Ernesto Zedillo Ponce de León (born 1951)	1994	1 December 1994	30 November 2000	6 years	Institutional Revolutionary Party
62		Vicente Fox Quesada (born 1942)	2000	1 December 2000	30 November 2006	6 years	National Action Party
63		Felipe Calderón Hinojosa (born 1962)	2006	1 December 2006	30 November 2012	6 years	National Action Party
64		Enrique Peña Nieto (born 1966)	2012	1 December 2012	30 November 2018	6 years	Institutional Revolutionary Party
65		Andrés Manuel López Obrador (born 1953)	2018	1 December 2018	30 September 2024	5 years, 304 days	National Regeneration Movement
66		Claudia Sheinbaum Pardo (born 1962)	2024	1 October 2024	Incumbent (Term ends on 30 September 2030)	2 years, 42 days	National Regeneration Movement

== Presidents who died in office ==
President	Term of office	Date of death	Notes
Benito Juárez	1857–1872	18 July 1872 (aged 66)	Natural causes.
Venustiano Carranza	1914–1920	21 May 1920 (aged 60)	Assassinated.

== See also ==
- President of Mexico
- Emperor of Mexico
- First Lady and Gentleman of Mexico
- Politics of Mexico
- History of Mexico
  - Aztec Empire
    - Tenochtitlan
      - List of tlatoque of Tenochtitlan
  - New Spain
    - List of viceroys of New Spain
