= Protasio Tagle =

Mexican politician

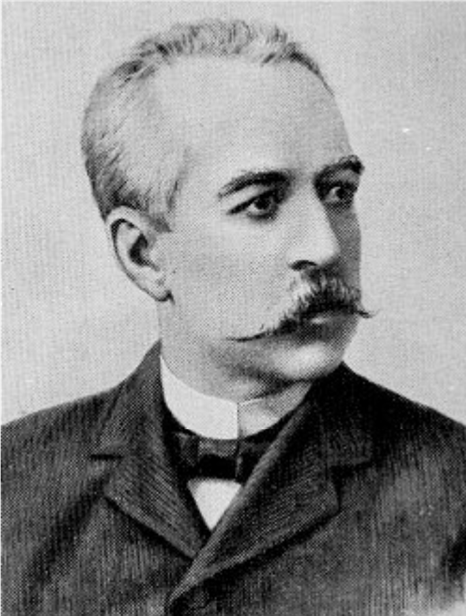
- Photograph portrait of Tagle by Agustín Casasola, c. 1890

Secretary of Justice and Public Instruction
- In office 24 June 1877 – 15 November 1879
- President: Porfirio Díaz
- Preceded by: Ignacio Ramírez
- Succeeded by: Juan N. García

Secretary of the Interior
- In office 28 November 1876 – 23 May 1877
- President: Porfirio Díaz; Juan N. Méndez; Porfirio Díaz
- Preceded by: Juan José Baz
- Succeeded by: Trinidad García de la Cadena

Governor of the Federal District
- In office 21 November – 28 November 1876

Deputy of the Congress of the Union for the 25th district of the State of Mexico
- In office 8 December 1867 – 31 April 1871

Personal details
- Born: 1839 Mexico City, Centralist Republic of Mexico
- Died: 31 July 1903 (aged 63–64) Mexico City, Mexico
- Resting place: Panteón del Tepeyac
- Party: Liberal

Protasio Pérez de Tagle Frago (Note: He shortened his surname from "Pérez de Tagle" to "Tagle" for personal reasons. Many sources abbreviate his name as "Protasio P. Tagle".) (1839 – 31 July 1903) was a Mexican soldier, politician and lawyer. He served as secretary of the interior from 1876 to 1877 under Presidents Porfirio Díaz and Juan N. Méndez and as secretary of justice and public education from 1877 to 1879 under Díaz. He was previously governor of the Federal District for one week in 1876, and before that was a member of the Chamber of Deputies representing the State of Mexico for two terms.

== Biography ==
=== Early life ===
Protasio Pérez de Tagle Frago was born in 1839 in Mexico City. His father, Mariano Pérez de Tagle was a wealthy hacienda owner. His mother was Antonia Frago de Tagle. He had a brother, Mariano Pérez de Tagle Frago. Another brother, Ciro, would also serve in the administration of Porfirio Díaz as an ambassador. From his father, Tagle inherited the hacienda of San Bartolomé de los Tepetates near Ciudad Sahagún. Tagle became a lawyer in 1871.

He participated in the Reform War (1857–1861) as a member of the liberal sector, and later led a republican division during the second French intervention in Mexico (1861–1867).

In 1867 Tagle was elected to the Chamber of Deputies for the State of Mexico, and he would continue to serve until 1875. Beginning in 1867, Tagle was part of a group of deputies who proposed the separation of what is now the State of Hidalgo from the State of Mexico, the decree for which would be signed in 1869. In October of 1868, Tagle was a member of the Grand Jury of Congress that found General Benigno Canto responsible for the murder of General José María Patoni. On 1 December, he also signed an opinion that accused secretary of war Ignacio Mejía of not respecting the budget of his department.

In 1870 or 1871, he helped found the Asociación Democrática Constitucionalista, (Note: Alicia Bravo Rodríguez says it was founded in November of 1870, while Humberto Musacchio says January of 1871.) which supported General Porfirio Díaz's presidential campaign in the 1871 election. Subsequently, Tagle and Justo Benítez supported Díaz's Plan de la Noria. Later, Tagle was one of the biggest congressional opponents of President Sebastián Lerdo de Tejada.

In 1876, Tagle was a co-author of Díaz's Plan of Tuxtepec. Tagle was on the directorate that supported the Tuxtepec uprising from Mexico City, along with Ignacio Vallarta, Pedro Ogazón, and Ireneo Paz. As a result of the uprising, on 20 November, President Lerdo fled Mexico City, and Tagle was left in charge of civil governance. The following day, Tagle became governor of the Federal District. Díaz arrived in Mexico City on 23 November. On the 28th, Tagle declared as governor that Díaz should assume the presidency, which he did the same day.

=== Díaz and Méndez administrations ===
Tagle's governorship also ended on the 28th, as he became secretary of the interior in Díaz's cabinet, succeeding Juan José Baz. Díaz's cabinet initially consisted of tuxtepecanos (supporters of the Tuxtepec uprising) including Tagle, Benítez, Ogazón, and Vallarta.

On 6 December, Díaz resigned from the presidency, making Juan N. Méndez provisional president. Tagle retained his post under Méndez. On 15 January 1877, Tagle published a memo that promised to respect religious freedom and the laws of La Reforma. This memo pleased Mexican Catholics and the Vatican, who had been hoping for a shift away from the anti-clerical policies of previous Mexican governments. This and his family background led to accusations of Tagle of having conservative sympathies. The government newspaper Diario Oficial defended Tagle as a liberal, but stated that he had given jobs to "intelligent and honorable" members of the Conservative Party.

Díaz took office again on 17 February, and Tagle remained in his post until 23 May, when he was succeeded by Trinidad García de la Cadena. Tagle was unpopular in the position and was severely criticised for his support of the Federal District's governor over banned forms of gaming.

On 14 May 1877 the Chamber of Deputies elected him to the Supreme Court. On 2 June, he requested a leave of absence from his Supreme Court position, but was denied; upset with the refusal, he presented his resignation, which was accepted on 2 May 1878.

On 24 June 1877, Tagle became Secretary of Justice and Public Instruction, succeeding Ignacio Ramírez. Earlier attempts in the decade had been made to abolish the Escuela Nacional Preparatoria (ENP). Ramírez and then Tagle made minor modifications to the ENP's requirements in 1877, though they were broadly supportive of the school and its philosophy. Also in 1877, Tagle banned public and private admonition and expulsions for a day as punishments in schools.

Following Supreme Court President José María Iglesias not recognizing Lerdo's 1876 reelection, the Díaz government sought to depoliticize the Supreme Court and reform the country's amparo law. The first attempt was a law proposed by Tagle to the Chamber of Deputies on 3 October. This would begin a process of strengthening the executive and weakening the judiciary during the Porfiriato. The Chamber studied his proposal and on 19 November made a number of reforms. It is not clear if the Chamber adopted Tagle's proposal, and two more proposals would be made by others until one was approved five years after Tagle's attempt. He was still an unpopular figure, and when he spoke at Ramírez's funeral on 18 June 1879, the audience reacted negatively. Tagle left the post on 15 November 1879, being succeeded by Juan N. García. In 1879 there were possibilities for him to be the presidential candidate, but he was defeated by Manuel González and finally retired from political activities. González's ascent marked the final break between Tagle and Díaz. By the end of the Díaz administration, the departure of men such as Tagle and Benítez had left none of Díaz's six original cabinet secretaries in power, clearing the way for González's rise.

=== Later life ===
Following his retirement from politics, Tagle taught Roman law at the Escuela Nacional de Jurisprudencia. One of his students was the future politician Toribio Esquivel Obregón. He also continued to serve as a lawyer and managed his hacienda, which had a small primary school.

Tagle died in Mexico City on 31 July 1903 of an intestinal illness. He was buried in the Panteón del Tepeyac in Mexico City. Tagle was survived by a son, Cornelio Pérez de Tagle.

== Legacy ==
A number of locales in Mexico City bear Tagle's name. These include the street Calle Gob. Protasio Tagle, the park Parque Protasio Tagle, and the primary school Escuela Primaria Lic. Protasio Tagle.
