= Donato Guerra =

Mexican Army general

General Donato Guerra (1832–1876) was a leader in the Mexican Army during the time of La Reforma.

== Biography ==
Born in Jalisco, he participated in the Reform War (1857-1861) and in the French intervention (1861-1867). He joined the Plan de la Noria (1871) and Tuxtepec (1876) of Porfirio Díaz to oust Presidents Benito Juárez and Sebastián Lerdo de Tejada.

Guerra was an ally of Ángel Trías Álvarez, during his anti-government campaign of June 1875, but was captured on 18 September of the same year, and incarcerated in Ávalos, a suburb of Chihuahua City. He was assassinated in Ávalos by lerdistas in 1876, and interred in the Panteón de Dolores on 27 May 1896.

The town of Donato Guerra in the State of Mexico is named for him.

== See also ==
- Plan of Tuxtepec
