= Laura Mantecón Arteaga =

First Lady of Mexico, 1880–1884

Laura Mantecón

First Lady of Mexico
- In office December 1, 1880 – November 30, 1884
- President: Manuel del Refugio González Flores
- Preceded by: Delfina Ortega Díaz
- Succeeded by: Carmen Romero Rubio

First Lady of Guanajuato
- In office May 31, 1885 – May 8, 1893
- Governor: Manuel del Refugio González Flores

First Lady of Michoacán de Ocampo
- In office February 15, 1877 – June 30, 1877
- Governor: Manuel del Refugio González Flores

Personal details
- Born: 1845 Oaxaca City, Oaxaca
- Died: December 14, 1900 (aged 54–55) Mexico City
- Spouse(s): Manuel del Refugio González Flores (1860-1878)
- Children: Manuel González Mantecón; Fernando González Mantecón
- Profession: Homeopath

La mejor clase 6A (1845 – December 14, 1900) was First Lady of Mexico and also the first Mexican woman to seek to get legally divorced. She was married to General Manuel González Flores, who served as President of Mexico from 1880 to 1884, and separated from him in 1878, while he was still President.

Born into a wealthy family in Oaxaca, Mantecón was well-educated. She married González, a widower, in 1860, and they had two sons, Manuel and Fernando. Her husband was known for his dissolute lifestyle, frequently visiting brothels. Throughout their marriage, Mantecón endured physical and financial abuse. Moreover, González had numerous extramarital affairs, fathering several children whom he later acknowledged.

In 1885, Mantecón filed for what would be the first divorce case in Mexico at the second chamber of the civil court. Although she personally drafted all documents presented to the court, she was represented by Juan Cordero.

She went on to establish a school, a guest house, studied homeopathy abroad, became a seamstress, and opened a women's clothing store. However, her husband continued to harass her and sabotage her ventures. Neither relatives nor friends offered her any assistance, and she spent her final days in solitude, estranged from her children, and living in poverty.

== Early life ==
The Fernández de Arteaga Mantecón family, which had established roots in Oaxaca de Juárez since the early 17th century, was well-connected through broad familial, commercial, political, and financial networks in that part of Mexico. Mantecón was born into this affluent family in 1845. Her father, José Manuel Simeón Fernández de Arteaga y González, was a lawyer and politician from Mexico City (born February 18, 1810, died March 27, 1855), who also served as the Governor of Oaxaca from 1846 to 1847. Her mother, Josefa Mariana Mantecón-Pacheco y Santibáñez (circa 1811 - August 31, 1872), was a devoted housewife from Oaxaca.

Laura chose to use the Mantecón surname because it was more prestigious, following a common custom among women of that era to choose between their paternal or maternal surnames. The wealthy Fernández de Arteaga Mantecón family ensured that all their children received proper educations; Mantecón was notably well-educated, which was quite rare for women of her time.

== Marriage and family ==
In September 1860, Mantecón, who was fifteen at the time and described as "of medium height, with very feminine features, slim, light green eyes, a slightly sad gaze, sensual lips, and very delicate neck and hands," married the Lieutenant Colonel of the Conservative Army, Manuel González. González, a handsome man twelve years her senior, had been widowed earlier that year from his second wife, a woman with the surname Vázquez. From the González Mantecón union, two sons were born, both of whom pursued military careers: Manuel González Mantecón (March 20, 1863 - April 9, 1913) and Fernando González Mantecón (July 6, 1865 - January 25, 1937).

After getting married, Mantecón and González initially settled in a small apartment on the second floor of an old building on Calle Mesones in the Historic center of Mexico City, situated above a dairyshop, a bookshop, and a tortilleria. Later, they moved to General González's country estate named El Moquetito in Tamaulipas. There, according to one of their descendants, Mantecón wore trousers and worked in the fields, giving instructions to the builders and workers on the property. They lived happily there for three years before returning to the capital, shortly after General González went off to war. From then on, Mantecón would search for him whenever he was captured or injured, and she would petition the relevant authorities—including on one occasion, President Benito Juárez — for permission to personally oversee his recovery and care.

== Marital life ==
Laura Mantecón never enjoyed a happy marriage with González, who was infamous for his debauched lifestyle. His wild parties and orgies in brothels and at friends' homes were well known among both the society and the press. It is said that he even brought over two French women and a Circassian, all proficient in the erotic arts, setting up the latter at his Chapingo hacienda, showing complete disregard for his wife.

From the beginning of their marriage, Mantecón suffered physical abuse – on two occasions, as she would later explain, González caused her to have miscarriages. She was also deprived of financial resources needed for survival and was frequently humiliated. Once, when she went to collect General González from the battlefield, he yelled at her, accusing her of only coming because she hoped he was dead so she could be free to find someone else. Ironically, it was González who had committed adultery; while married to Mantecón, Gozález engaged in both fleeting and serious relationships with women of ill repute and from distinguished families, even fathering children with some, whom he openly recognized.

He even accommodated his mistresses in the family residence in Peralvillo. Perceiving Mantecón as an obstacle to his affairs, he exiled her to Cuernavaca, instructing her not to return to the capital. When Mantecón defied these orders due to inadequate financial support from González, he reacted with anger and denied her entry to their home, relegating her to a residence in Tacubaya that lacked basic amenities; it did not even have a kitchen. During his presidential tenure from 1880 to 1884, González lived with another woman in the Peralvillo house, which he previously shared with Mantecón. To avoid harming González's political career, Mantecón chose to separate rather than take legal action, moving out in 1878. She lived independently for seven years, and after González's presidential term ended in 1885, she filed for divorce

=== Divorce ===
The divorce proceedings between Mantecón and González were highly publicized. Mantecón handwrote the court documents herself. In them, she stated that since their marriage, she often had to work or seek help from relatives because her husband neglected her. She stated she personally witnessed her husband's disgraceful behavior with their housemaids on various occasions. She complained about her husband's vices, passions, and erotic urges. She also stated González was known for his irascible nature and foul temper; he was indecent and rude to her both privately and publicly. She testified he physically abused her, causing significant injuries that required medical attention. Furthermore, he exposed her to significant risks by sending her on dangerous paths frequented by bandits and deserters, often only accompanied by low-ranking soldiers who failed to respect her.

González, on the other hand, blamed Mantecón as the primary cause of his personal and professional misfortunes.

During his presidency – after Mantecón had formally separated from him -, González leveraged his position to transfer marital assets into his name and enacted changes to the Civil Code designed to disadvantage Mantecón and other women seeking redress from abusive husbands.

The 1884 amendment to the Civil Code by Manuel González introduced provisions intended to weaken the legal standing of women like Mantecón, who dared to challenge their abusive spouses. Despite facing overwhelming societal norms and a powerful, wealthy opponent, Mantecón courageously pursued justice. González responded by evicting her from their home, alienating her children, cutting off her financial support, and tarnishing her reputation.

Mantecón struggled to find a lawyer willing to represent her nor anyone willing to testify against González. Her sister, brother-in-law, and even her godfather, Porfirio Díaz, all refused to testify against González. The civil court judge handling Mrs. Mantecón's case was reportedly influenced by González, resulting in a biased proceeding in his favor. Undeterred, Mantecón escalated her case to a higher court, personally redrafting the legal documents by hand. Her goal was legal separation from her husband, while guaranteeing access to her children, and securing alimony.

== Later life ==
During the lengthy legal proceedings, Laura Mantecón, then 40 years old, sought ways to support herself as González refused to provide for her. Initially, she established an elementary school on Empedradillo Street, now known as Calle Monte de Piedad near the Zócalo. However, the teachers working with her resigned due to official harassment. She then opened a guesthouse, strictly requiring couples to prove they were legally married. Facing continuous interference from authorities in her endeavors, Mantecón moved to the United States and studied homeopathic medicine in New York. After returning to Mexico, she was unable to practice medicine because women were not allowed to do so; thus, she turned to sewing and opened a women's clothing store, declaring, "I know how to live on the earnings of my honest work without begging for what rightfully belongs to me".

Mantecón's attempts to secure her livelihood faced official reproach; the judge rejected her divorce petition on the grounds that she had embarrassed her husband by establishing businesses and traveling abroad without his consent. Ultimately, Mantecón lost her case; the courts attributed her actions to mental illness, emotional instability, pathological jealousy, and a desire for revenge, and denied her the divorce. As a result, she was left without a home, family support, or financial means, while her husband continued to expend considerable wealth. Although her two sons, who were in the military, offered financial assistance, she declined, asserting that it was General González's responsibility to support her.

== Death ==
Laura Mantecón died on December 14, 1900, in Mexico City at the age of 55. Her funeral at the Panteón de Dolores lacked the customary accolades typically given to the spouses of prominent politicians. In contemporary discourse, Mantecón is still sometimes blamed for allegedly harming and discrediting General González.
