= Battle of Tlatempa =

1859 battle of the Mexican Reform War

- Part of the Reform War
Date	5 July 1859
Location	Tlatempa, Zacatlán, Puebla
Result	Liberal victory

Belligerents
Liberals	Conservative

Commanders and leaders
Juan N. Méndez	Carlos Oronoz

The battle of Tlatempa took place on 5 July 1859 in the vicinity of Zacatlán in the state of Puebla, Mexico, between elements of the Liberal army, under General Juan N. Mendez and Conservative elements of the army commanded by General Carlos Oronoz who was the commander Zacatlán military during the War of Reform. The battle ended as liberal victory, leaving in a very compromising situation to General Miramon because this was amagado the south with the forces of Ignacio Zaragoza, in the north by Jesus Gonzalez Ortega and from the east by Santos Degollado.
