= 1861 Mexican general election =

← 1857	1861	1867 →
- Presidential election
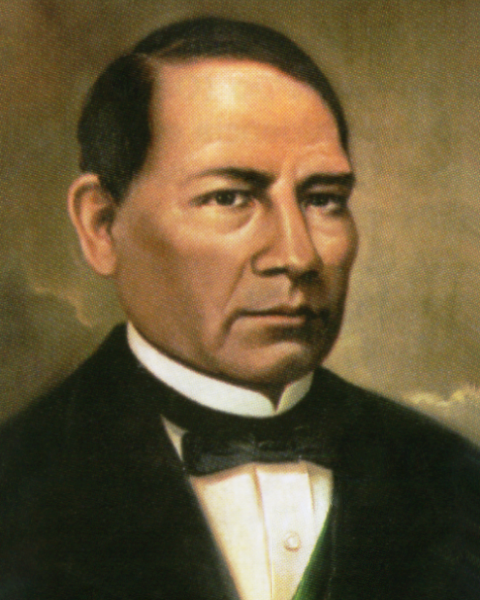

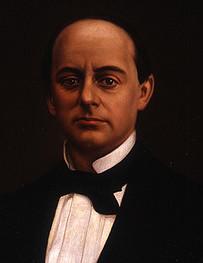

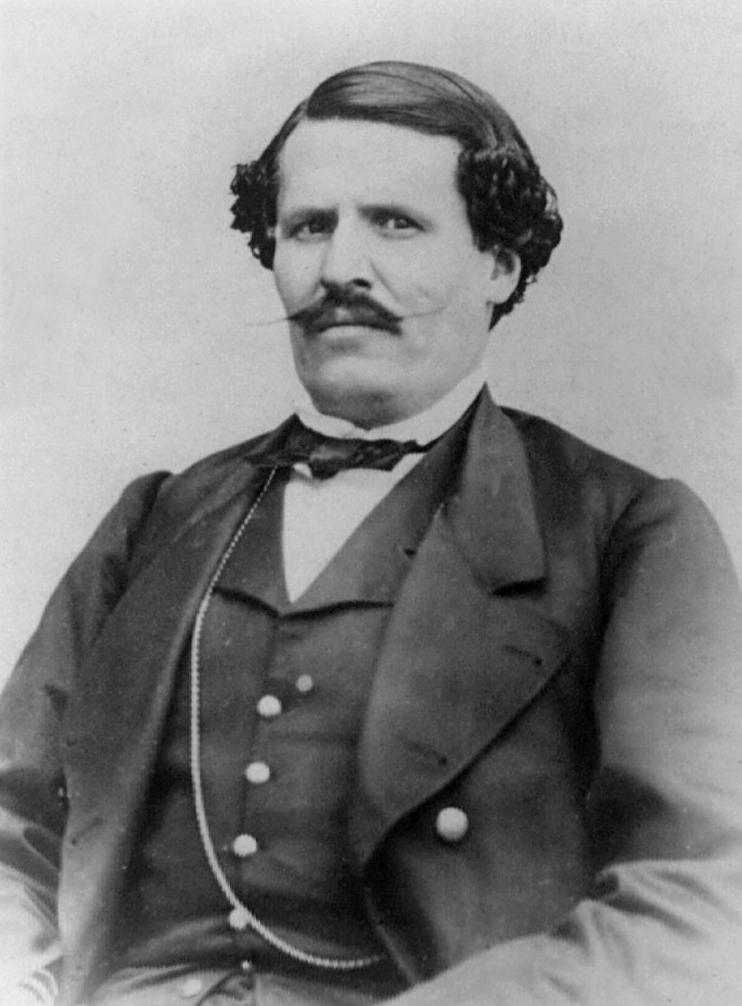
Nominee	Benito Juárez	Sebastián Lerdo de Tejada	Jesús González Ortega
Popular vote	5,161	2,700	1,800
Percentage	53.41%	27.94%	18.63%
President before election
Benito Juárez
Elected President
Benito Juárez

General elections were held in Mexico in 1861. Although incumbent president Benito Juárez received a majority (53%) of the popular vote, opponents claimed his margin of victory was not enough and a Congressional vote was required. The Congressional election committee released two reports, one produced by the majority declaring Juárez the winner, and one stating that there should be a Congressional vote between Juárez and runner-up Sebastián Lerdo de Tejada. The majority report was approved by a vote of 61–55, and Juárez was subsequently inaugurated on 15 June.

== Results ==
=== President ===
Candidate	Votes	%
Benito Juárez	5,161	53.41
Sebastián Lerdo de Tejada	2,700	27.94
Jesús González Ortega	1,800	18.63
José Bernardo Couto	1	0.01
Mariano Riva Palacio	1	0.01
Total	9,663	100.00
Source: Ramírez Rancaño
