= 1884 Mexican general election =

← 1880	1884	1888 →
- Presidential election
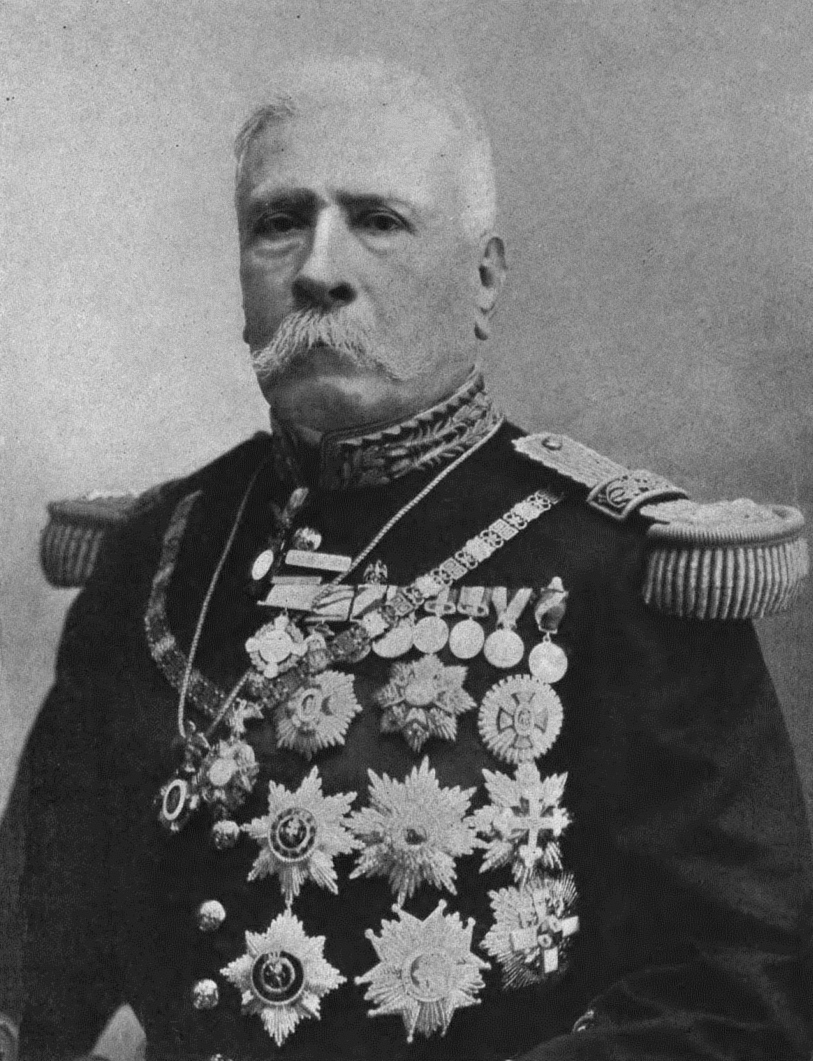

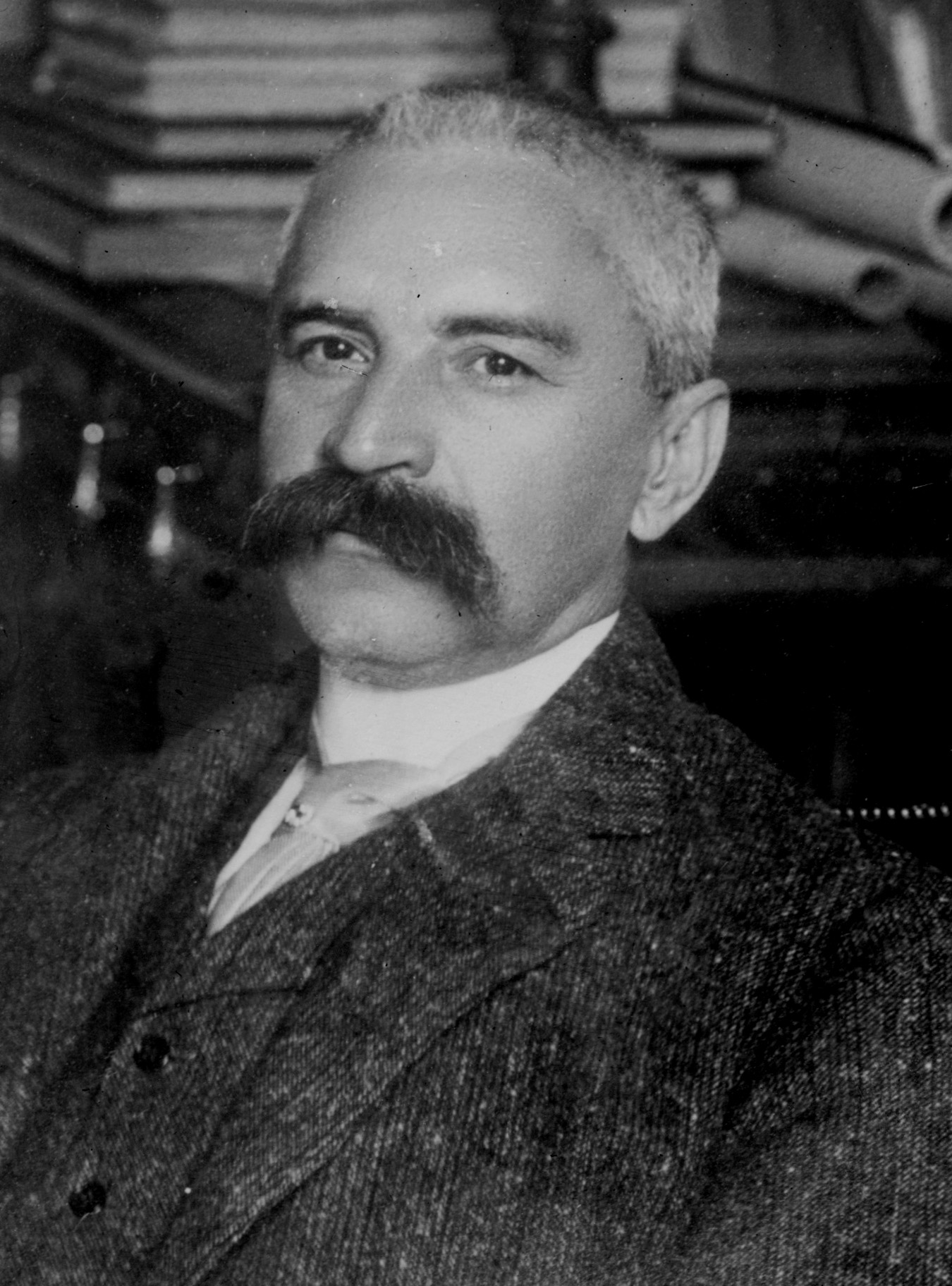
Nominee	Porfirio Díaz	Ramón Corral
Popular vote	15,766	31
Percentage	98.83%	0.19%
President before election
Manuel González Flores
Elected President
Porfirio Díaz

General elections were held in Mexico in 1884. The result of the presidential election was a victory for Porfirio Díaz, who received 99% of the vote.

== Results ==
=== President ===
Candidate	Votes	%
Porfirio Díaz	15,766	98.83
Ramón Corral	31	0.19
Ignacio Manuel Altamirano	26	0.16
Vicente Riva Palacio	23	0.14
Jerónimo Treviño	21	0.13
Trinidad García de la Cadena	18	0.11
Other candidates	68	0.43
Blank votes	68	0.43
Total	15,953	100.00
Source: Ramírez Rancaño
