= Albert Ramsey =

American journalist

- Born: Albert C. Ramsey c. 1813; Pennsylvania, U.S.
- Died: 1869
- Education: Gettysburg College; Dickinson College
- Spouse: Sarah Wilmer
- Relatives: William Ramsey (father); William Sterrett Ramsey (brother)
- Military career
- Allegiance: United States
- Branch: United States Army
- Commands: 11th Infantry Regiment
- Conflicts: Mexican–American War

Albert C. Ramsey (c. 1813–1869) was a member of the United States military during the Mexican–American War who is most notable as the translator of Ramón Alcaraz's history of the Mexican War published as The Other Side: Or Notes for the History of the War between Mexico and the United States.

Ramsey was the son of Pennsylvania Representative William Ramsey and younger brother of William Sterrett Ramsey. He studied at Dickinson College and later earned a master's degree from Gettysburg College. He was admitted to the bar in 1834. After this he was for a time a district attorney and also edited the York, Pennsylvania Democratic Press.

In April 1847, Ramsey joined the regular army as a colonel in the 11th Infantry. He fought in the Mexican War, and remained in Texas after the war, learning Spanish and later translating Alcaraz's work. In 1844, Ramsey had married Sarah Wilmer in Maryland.

During the 1850s Ramsey also ran a mail service that transported mail from New Orleans to San Francisco, going overland from Vera Cruz to Acapulco.

When the Civil War broke out, Ramsey returned to New York but his wife remained in Texas as a rebel sympathizer. He helped to raise troops in Dutchess County, New York, but did not serve in the war.

== Sources ==
- Dickinson alumni encyclopedia
