= Ramón Isaac Alcaraz =

- Born: 3 June 1823; Chucándiro, Michoacán, Mexico
- Died: 8 April 1886 (aged 62); Mexico City

Ramón Isaac Alcaraz (3 June 1823 – 8 April 1886) was a Mexican poet, writer and liberal politician.

Alcaraz was born in Chucándiro, Michoacán, in 1823. He earned a law degree in Morelia, Michoacán, and, by 1836, was continuing his studies in Mexico City, where he joined the Academia de Letrán, a leading literary society of the time. He published his first poem, on the death of Ignacio Rodríguez Galván, in 1842, and later poems appeared in the journals El Museo Mexicano and El Liceo Mexicano and in the collection Guirnalda Poética (1853). A two-volume collection of his verse, Poesías, was published in 1860.

After fighting in the Mexican–American War of 1846–1848, he was one of the contributors to Apuntes para la historia de la guerra entre México y los Estados Unidos (1848), (Note: The work credits 14 other contributors, including José María Iglesias, Manuel Payno, Guillermo Prieto and Ignacio Ramírez. Alcaraz heads the alphabetically sorted list.) a work that President Antonio López de Santa Anna deemed "offensive to the republic", ordering its first edition seized and burned. In 1850, Albert C. Ramsey translated the Apuntes into English as The Other Side, or: Notes for the History of the War Between Mexico and the United States, Written in Mexico).

Alcaraz was elected to the 1856–57 Constituent Congress, where he served on the industry committee. He followed President Benito Juárez into exile during the Reform War (1858–1860) and French Intervention (1861–1867).

Following the restoration of the republic, he served as the director of the National Museum from 1867 to 1876 and was appointed director of the Academia de San Carlos in 1869. He was elected to the Mexican Academy of Language in 1880.

Ramón Alcaraz died in Mexico City in 1886.
