= Battle of Tecoac =

- Part of the Revolution of Tuxtepec
Date	November 16, 1876
Location	Tecoac, Tlaxcala, Mexico
Result	Victory for Díaz

Belligerents
(Mexico) Federal Government	Tuxtepec rebels

Commanders and leaders
Ignacio R. Alatorre	Porfirio Díaz

Strength
3,000	7,800

The Battle of Tecoac (Spanish: Batalla de Tecoac) was fought at Tecoac (municipality of Huamantla) in the Mexican state of Tlaxcala on November 16, 1876, between the forces of Sebastián Lerdo de Tejada, then President of Mexico, and those of Porfirio Díaz. The battle was a victory for Díaz, who subsequently assumed the presidency himself; Lerdo went into exile in New York City.

== See also ==
- Plan of Tuxtepec
