= 1876 Mexican general election =

- 1876
- Presidential election
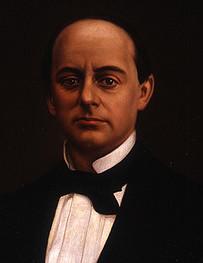
Nominee	Sebastián Lerdo de Tejada
Popular vote	7,536
Percentage	90.93%
President before election
Sebastián Lerdo de Tejada
Elected President
Sebastián Lerdo de Tejada

General elections were held in Mexico in 1876. Incumbent president Sebastián Lerdo de Tejada was re-elected with over 90% of the vote. However, he was removed from office by the end of the year as a result of the Plan of Tuxtepec.

== Results ==
=== President ===
Candidate	Votes	%
Sebastián Lerdo de Tejada	7,536	90.93
Other candidates	752	9.07
Total	8,288	100.00
Source: Ramírez Rancaño
