= 1888 Mexican general election =

| ← 1884 | 1888 | 1892 → |
- Presidential election
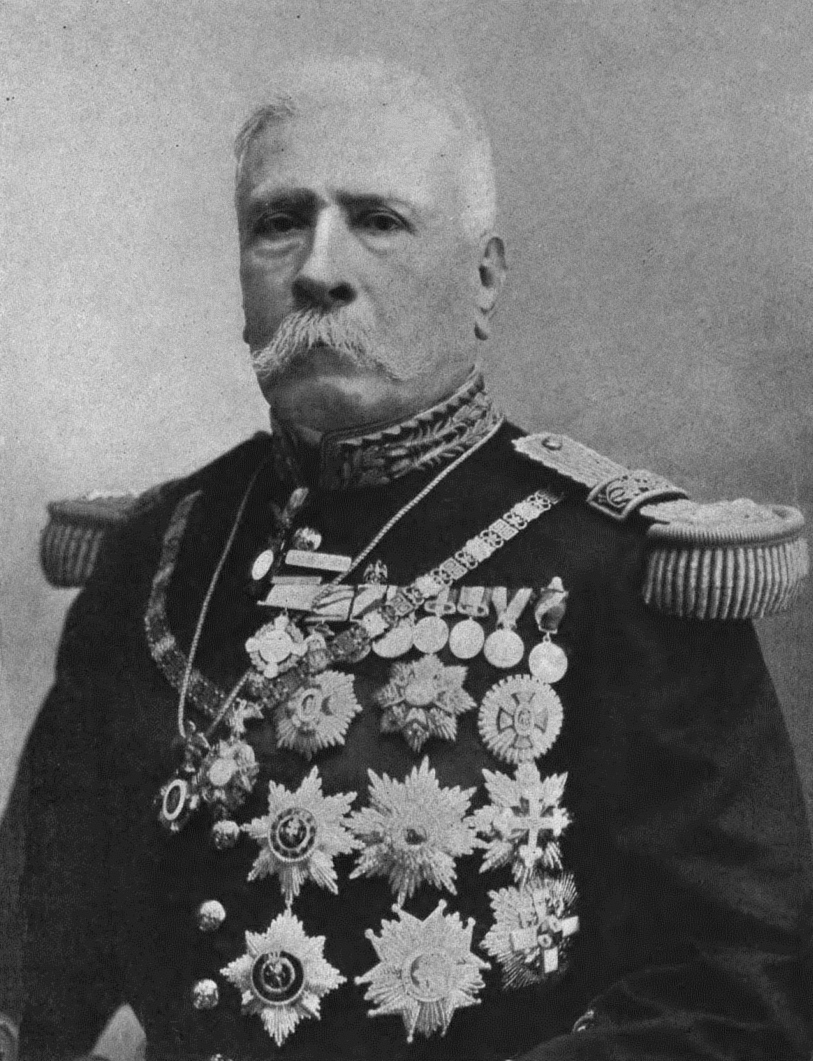

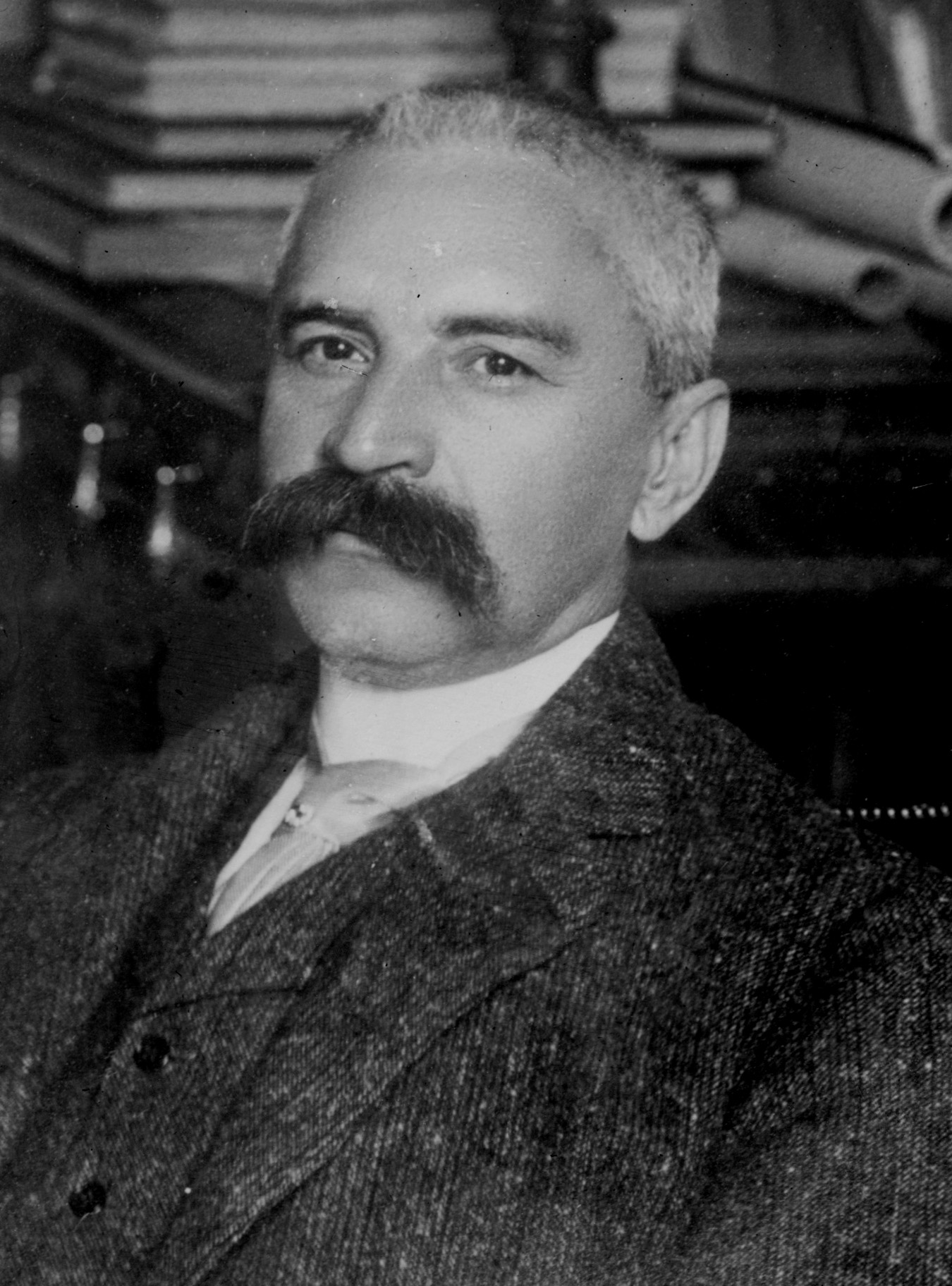
| Nominee | Porfirio Díaz | Ramón Corral |
| Popular vote | 16,662 | 6 |
| Percentage | 99.72% | 0.04% |
President before election
Porfirio Díaz
Elected President
Porfirio Díaz

General elections were held in Mexico in 1888. Incumbent president Porfirio Díaz was re-elected with 99.7% of the vote.

== Results ==
=== President ===
| Candidate | Votes | % |
|---|---|---|
| Porfirio Díaz | 16,662 | 99.72 |
| Ramón Corral | 6 | 0.04 |
| Mariano Escobedo | 5 | 0.03 |
| Ignacio Vallarta | 5 | 0.03 |
| Other candidates | 26 | 0.16 |
| Blank votes | 5 | 0.03 |
| Total | 16,709 | 100.00 |
Source: Ramírez Rancaño
