= José María Iglesias =

President of Mexico in 1876

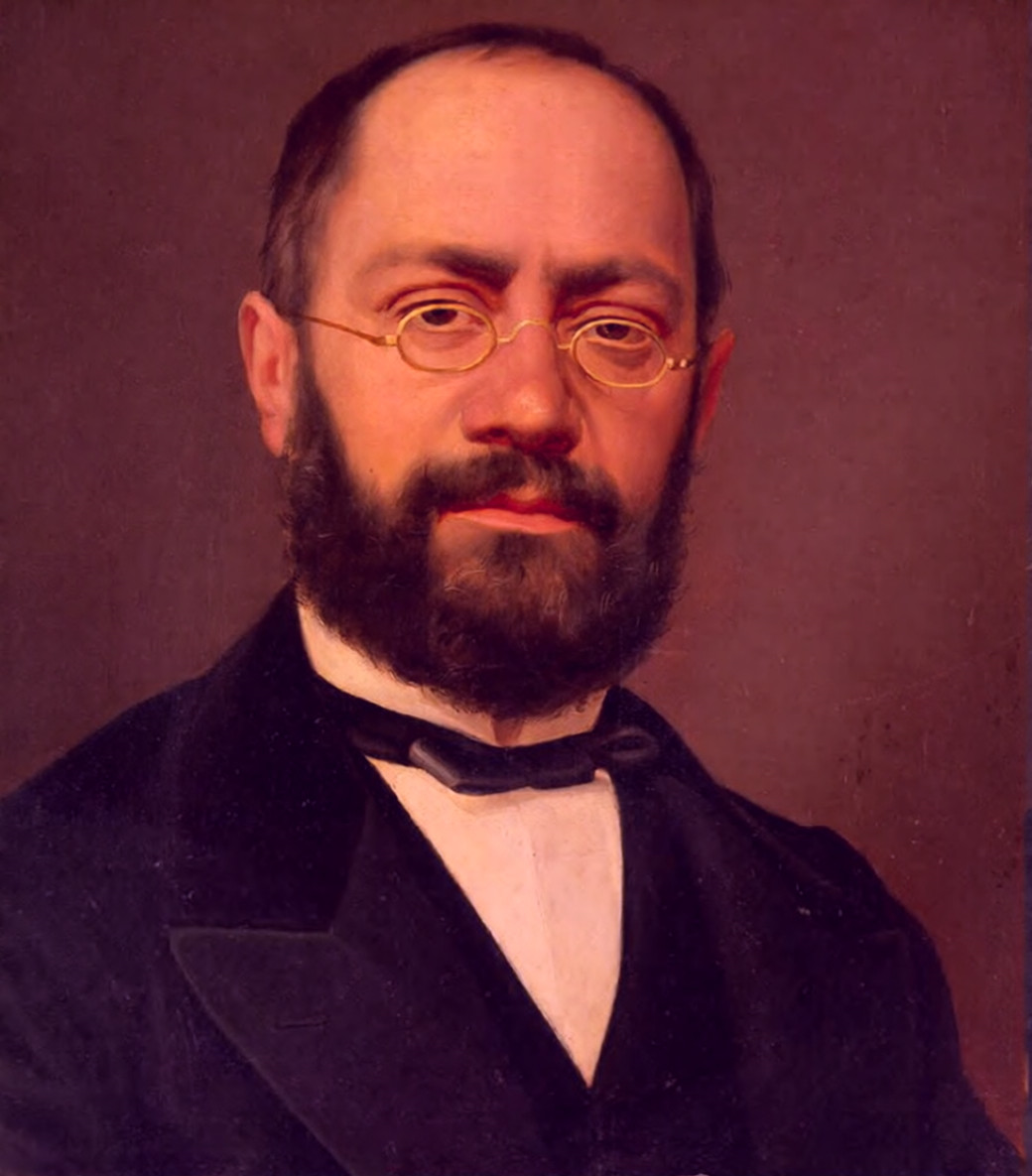
- Portrait of Iglesias

32nd President of Mexico
- In office 20 November – 28 November 1876
- Preceded by: Sebastián Lerdo de Tejada
- Succeeded by: Porfirio Díaz

Personal details
- Born: 5 January 1823 Mexico City, First Mexican Empire
- Died: 17 December 1891 (aged 68) Tacubaya, Mexico City
- Party: Liberal
- Spouse: Juana Calderón Tapia
- Occupation: Politician
- Profession: Lawyer

José María Juan Nepomuceno Crisóforo Iglesias Inzáurraga (5 January 1823 – 17 December 1891) was a Mexican lawyer, professor, journalist and liberal politician. He is known as author of the Iglesias law, an anticlerical law regulating ecclesiastical fees and aimed at preventing the impoverishment of the Mexican peasantry.

From 31 October 1876 to 23 January 1877, as revolts against the presidency of Sebastian Lerdo de Tejada broke out, he claimed the interim presidency of Mexico. However, he was never undisputed president. President Lerdo was overthrown and Porfirio Díaz emerged as the victor in the ensuing power struggles, after which Iglesias went into exile to the United States.

== Early life ==
José María Iglesias was born into a wealthy family in Mexico City, but when he was 12 his father died. Five years later, his mother also died. His maternal uncle Manuel Inzáurraga took responsibility for his education. He studied law at the Colegio Gregoriano in Mexico City, graduating with good marks, and was admitted to the bar in 1844.

== Career ==
=== Early positions ===
He became a professor of jurisprudence at the College of San Gregorio. He also collaborated on a newspaper opposed to the regime of Antonio López de Santa Anna. He became a city councilman in Mexico City in 1846, and after the U.S. invasion of that year, he was named to the Supreme Military Tribunal. At the end of the war, he took an important position in the Treasury Department in the government of Mariano Arista.

=== Political career ===
In 1852, Iglesias was elected to Congress, where he became known for his eloquence and his knowledge of constitutional law. In 1856, he was named chief clerk of the Treasury Department under President Ignacio Comonfort and later secretary of justice (January to May 1857). In the latter position, he was responsible for drafting the law that barred the Church from holding landed property. From May until September 1857, he was secretary of the treasury. On 16 September 1857, he was elected, by popular vote, a justice of the Supreme Court. Throughout the Reform War (1857–61), he was a strong defender of the Liberal cause in the press.

=== In Juárez's cabinet ===
With the fall of Puebla to the French on 17 May 1863, President Benito Juárez was forced to abandon Mexico City. Iglesias, a Liberal and a constitutionalist, accompanied him. In September, Juárez named him secretary of justice, a position he continued to hold until the Republican government returned to the capital in 1867 after the expulsion of Emperor Maximilian. During this period, he accompanied Juárez and the rest of the Republican government as they moved from place to place to avoid capture by the Imperialists. Part of this time, he was also secretary of the treasury.

After the return to Mexico City, Iglesias was again elected to Congress. In 1867, he became president of the Chamber of Deputies. From September 1868 until October 1869, he was secretary of the interior. Thereafter, he was secretary of justice again.

=== As interim president ===
In 1871, he retired to private life for reasons of health. He returned to public service the next year, and in July 1873 he was elected president of the Supreme Court. (Juárez had died in 1872 and Sebastián Lerdo de Tejada had succeeded him as president.) When Congress declared President Lerdo (also a Liberal and supporter of Juárez) re-elected on 26 September 1876, Iglesias, in his judicial capacity, declared the election illegal because of fraud and the constitutional succession interrupted. In the absence of a constitutional president, the constitution specified that executive power should be exercised by the president of the Supreme Court, and as such, Iglesias claimed the presidency. At the same time, General Porfirio Díaz proclaimed the Plan of Tuxtepec and rose against Lerdo.

Some of Iglesias's supporters were arrested by Lerdo de Tejada, and Iglesias was forced to flee the capital. He went to Guanajuato, where he was recognized as president of the Republic by Governor Florencio Antillón, General García de la Cadena, and the military commander of Jalisco, General Ceballos. In Salamanca, he issued a manifesto announcing his assumption of the government. He also named a cabinet. By December, the states of Guanajuato, Querétaro, Aguascalientes, Jalisco and San Luis Potosí had recognized him as president.

Meanwhile, Lerdo de Tejada was forced to abandon the capital after losing the Battle of Tecoac (Puebla) to General Porfirio Díaz. Díaz and Iglesias began negotiations, but when these broke down over the latter's refusal to recognize the Plan de Tuxtepec, Díaz marched against him. Iglesias fled to Guadalajara, where he installed his government on 2 January 1877. His forces under Antillón were defeated at Los Adobes, and he fled with his cabinet and General Ceballos to Manzanillo, Colima. On 16 January, he sailed for the United States.

=== Later life ===
In New York, he wrote La Cuestión Presidencial de 1876, a defense of his claims. He returned to Mexico in 1878 without problems. He was offered several important positions by the government, but he declined. He was editor-in-chief of various journals, and published Apuntes para la historia de la guerra entre México y los Estados Unidos (Mexico City, 1848), and Revistas Históricas sobre la Intervención Francesa (1870). His autobiography was published in 1893.

== Personal life and death ==
He died in Tacubaya, Mexico City, on 17 December 1891. In 1987 President Miguel de la Madrid ordered that Iglesias's remains be transferred to the Rotonda de las Personas Ilustres (Rotunda of Illustrious People).

== See also ==
- List of presidents of Mexico

Political offices
Preceded by Sebastián Lerdo de Tejada	President of Mexico; 26 October – 28 November 1876	Succeeded by Porfirio Díaz
