= 1872 Mexican presidential election =

- 1872
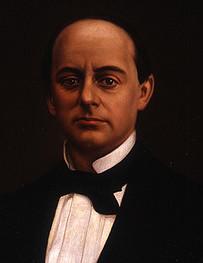

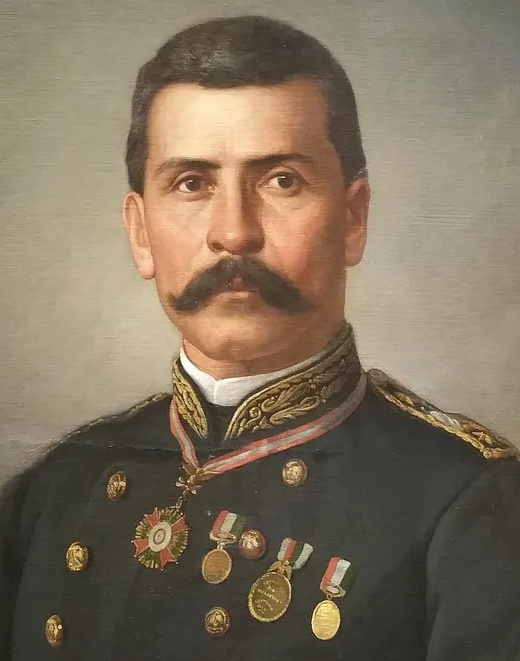
Nominee	Sebastián Lerdo de Tejada	Porfirio Diaz
Popular vote	9,520	604
Percentage	92.32%	5.86%
President before election
Benito Juárez
Elected President
Sebastián Lerdo de Tejada

Presidential elections were held in Mexico in 1872 following the death of president Benito Juárez. The result was a victory for Sebastián Lerdo de Tejada, who received 92% of the vote.

== Results ==
Candidate	Votes	%
Sebastián Lerdo de Tejada	9,520	92.32
Porfirio Díaz	604	5.86
Other candidates	136	1.32
Blank votes	52	0.50
Total	10,312	100.00
Source: Ramírez Rancaño
