= 1871 Mexican general election =

- 1871
- Presidential election
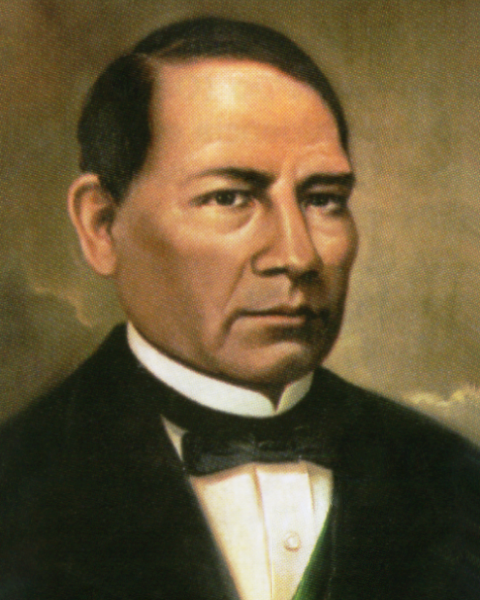

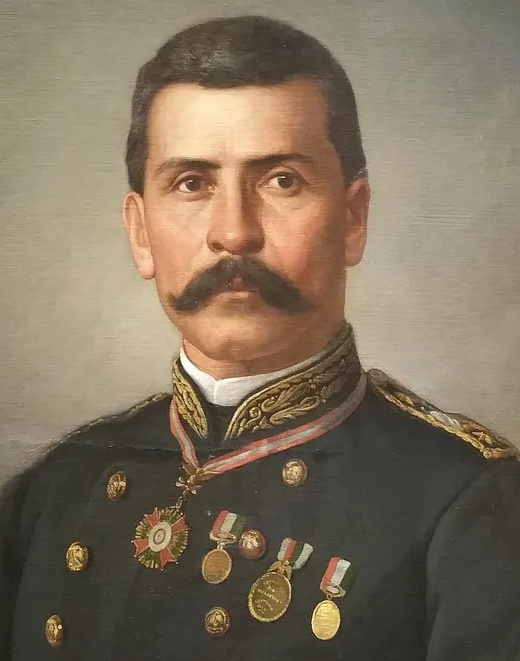
Nominee	Benito Juárez	Porfirio Díaz
Electoral vote	108	3
Popular vote	5,837	3,555
Percentage	47.63%	29.01%
President before election
Benito Juárez
Elected President
Benito Juárez

General elections were held in Mexico in 1871. In the presidential election, no candidate received more than 50% of the electoral college vote, resulting in Congress electing the winner. Having received 48% of the electoral college, incumbent president Benito Juárez was elected by Congress with 108 of the 116 votes cast. Following the elections, losing candidate Porfirio Díaz launched an unsuccessful rebellion.

== Results ==
=== President ===
Candidate	Electoral college vote		Congressional vote	
Candidate	Votes	%	Votes	%
Benito Juárez	5,837	47.63	108	93.10
Porfirio Díaz	3,555	29.01	3	2.59
Sebastián Lerdo de Tejada	2,864	23.37		
Blank votes			5	4.31
Total	12,256	100.00	116	100.00
Source: Ramírez Rancaño
