= Chapingo =

Town in State of Mexico, Mexico

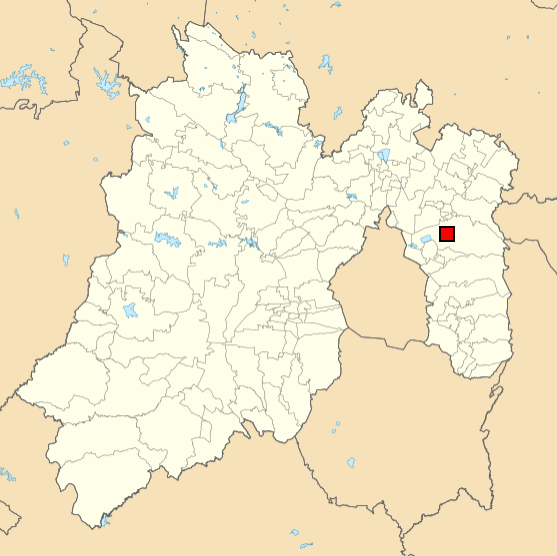

Chapingo is a small town located on the outskirts of the city of Texcoco, State of Mexico, in central Mexico.

It is located at 19°29′N 98°53′W, about 25 km (16 mi) east-northeast of Mexico City International Airport.

Chapingo is most notable as the location of Chapingo Autonomous University (Universidad Autónoma Chapingo). The UACh, as it is known, is the country's most prestigious center for agricultural studies. It was founded as the National School of Agriculture in Mexico City in 1854 and has been located on its current Chapingo campus since 1923.

It is very close, about 3 km (1.9 mi) from both the Colegio de Posgraduados (CP) postgraduate study centre and the International Maize and Wheat Improvement Center (CIMMYT). Chapingo combines with these other leading centers to form an unofficial "national consortium for agricultural development".

In the surrounding area is located also a new urban development now close to the municipal seat, Texcoco, cradle of the prehispanic Acolhuan culture, whose greatest figure was King Nezahualcoyotl. This urban settlement comprises Chapingo, Huexotla, Unidad ISSSTE (residential area for staff of UACH) as well as Salitreria and Texcoco (pop. 150,000).

University of Chapingo holds students from all states of Mexico, through an admission process carried out every year. This process not only gives admission but awards full scholarships to all students selected. Students are divided into three categories, depending on their socioeconomical status, however, no fees are charged to any national student. On the other hand, it holds rooms and facilities to accommodate students in campus.

The Autonomous university was a locus of work of the Rockefeller Foundation's initial support for beginnings of the Green Revolution with Norman Borlaug, who did a series of research projects on wheat varieties in the mid-1940s. UAC remains an important center for research.
