= 1880 Mexican general election =

- 1880
- Presidential election
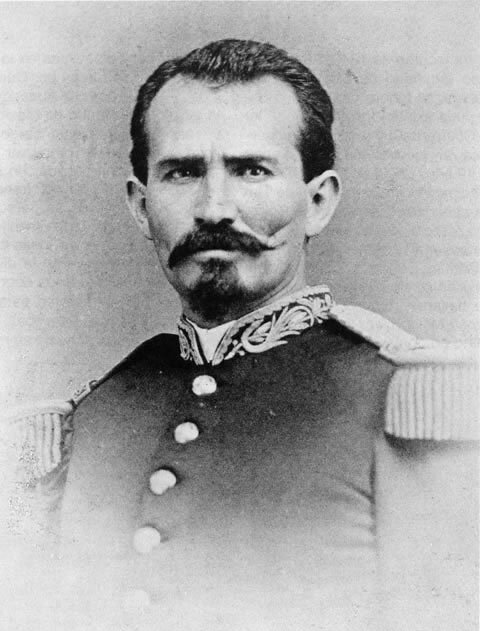

Nominee	Manuel González Flores	Justo Benítez	Trinidad García de la Cadena
Popular vote	11,528	1,368	1,075
Percentage	76.72%	9.10%	7.15%
President before election
Porfirio Díaz
Elected President
Manuel González Flores

General elections were held in Mexico in 1880. The presidential election resulted in a victory for Manuel González Flores, who received 77% of the vote.

== Results ==
=== President ===
Candidate	Votes	%
Manuel González Flores	11,528	76.72
Justo Benítez	1,368	9.10
Trinidad García de la Cadena	1,075	7.15
Ignacio Mejía	529	3.52
Ignacio Vallarta	165	1.10
Manuel María de Zamacona y Murphy	76	0.51
Other candidates	285	1.90
Blank votes	285	1.90
Total	15,026	100.00
Source: Ramírez Rancaño
