= Plan of Tuxtepec =

1876 call to oust Mexican president Sebastián Lerdo by Porfirio Díaz

In Mexican history, the Plan of Tuxtepec was a plan drafted by General Porfirio Díaz in 1876 and proclaimed on 10 January 1876 in the Villa de Ojitlán municipality of San Lucas Ojitlán, Tuxtepec district, Oaxaca. It was signed by a group of military officers led by Colonel Hermenegildo Sarmiento and drafted by porfiristas Vicente Riva Palacio, Ireneo Paz, and Protasio Tagle on the instigation of Díaz. Díaz signed the previous version of the plan in December 1875, which did not include the three most important articles that appointed Díaz as president. It disavowed Sebastián Lerdo de Tejada as President, while acknowledging the Constitution and the Reform laws, and proclaimed Díaz as the leader of the movement. Díaz later became the president of Mexico, ushering in a period known as the Porfiriato.

== History ==
Upon the death of President Benito Juárez in 1872, Sebastián Lerdo de Tejada, the President of the Supreme Court, assumed the interim presidency, and called for new elections. The two candidates registered were Lerdo de Tejada and General Porfirio Díaz, one of the heroes of the Battle of Puebla of 5 May 1862, who had since occupied several public positions. Díaz had challenged Juárez with his Plan de la Noria, in which he stated his opposition to presidential re-election and called for a Constituent Congress. Lack of support for this plan led to Díaz losing the elections of 1872.

Towards the end of his term, Lerdo de Tejada, who had already incorporated the Reform laws into the Constitution of Mexico, attempted to modify the constitution to enable his re-election, prompting Díaz to declare the Plan of Tuxtepec. On 21 March 1876, Díaz rebelled against President Lerdo de Tejada. The Plan of Tuxtepec proclaimed the "No Re-election" principle and emerged as the flag of General Porfirio Díaz. The plan had the support of General Donato Guerra, the head of the Mexican army, as well as other military chiefs who helped the movement in Jalisco on February 8, 1876. In the municipalities of Lagos, Teocaltiche, Jalostotitlán and San Miguel El Alto, Generals Donato Guerra and Rosendo Márquez attacked the garrison of San Juan de los Lagos, which surrendered without a major fight. Other key figures were General Pedro Galván and Florentino Cuervo, who captured Ameca. Colonel Félix Vélez Galván took up arms in Sayula, Jalisco on 12 February.

=== Aftermath ===
On 20 May 1876 in Icamole, Nuevo León, General Carlos Fuero, loyal to the government of Lerdo de Tejada, inflicted a heavy defeat on Díaz's rebels, who were forced to withdraw to the south of the Republic. Despite this defeat, Díaz continued his campaign against the lerdistas.

On October 26, the Congress affirmed the re-election of Lerdo de Tejada, but the president of the Supreme Court of Justice, José María Iglesias, declared it illegal. In his role as vice-president, Iglesias pursued the interim presidency. By this failure Sebastián Lerdo de Tejada was forced to leave power.

On 16 November 1876, Díaz faced General Ignacio R. Alatorre in the Battle of Tecoac, in the municipality of Huamantla, Tlaxcala. Both sides came close to winning the battle, but the arrival of porfirista reinforcements under the command of General Manuel González Flores, caused a decisive victory for Díaz's troops. Following a series of further battles, supporters of the Plan of Tuxtepec claimed victory, and Lerdo de Tejada had no choice but to surrender the presidency and Díaz entered Puebla in November. As a result of the plan's victory Supreme Court President José María Iglesias was appointed interim president until new elections could be held in Mexico City. As the only candidate, General Porfirio Díaz assumed the presidency on 12 May 1877.

In 1878, supported by the Plan of Tuxtepec, Díaz made two key reforms to the Constitution. The first was to remove the function of vice-president from the president of the Supreme Court of Justice. The second prohibited re-election, with a short statement that said: "Except after a period of four years", with which he started his long dictatorship and the period of Porfiriato.

== Articles ==
- Art. 1. - The supreme laws of the Republic are: the Constitution of 1857, the Reform Laws enacted on 25 September 1873 and the Act of December 14 of 1874.
- Art. 2. - Prohibition of re-election of the President and state governors has the same validity as the supreme laws.
- Art. 3. – Don Sebastian Lerdo de Tejada is disavowed as president of the Republic, as well as all officials and employees of his government.
- Art. 4. - The governments of all states will be recognized if they adhere to this plan. If they do not, the head of the army of each state will be recognized as governor.
- Art. 5. - There will be elections for the Supreme Powers of the Union, two months after the occupation of the capital of the republic, and without reconvening. Congress elections shall be held in accordance with the laws of 12 February 1857 and 23 October 1872, with the first taking place on the first Sunday two months after the occupation of the capital.
- Art. 6.- The Executive Power will settle, while the elections are carried out, in the city which obtains the majority of votes from States Governors, and will not have any more attributions than merely administrative ones.
- Art. 7.- The 8th Constituent Congress will be assembled; its first works will be: reform of Article 2 of the constitutional, which guarantees the independence of the municipalities, and a law giving political organization to the Federal District and territory of California.
- Art. 8 – All that directly or indirectly work towards the maintenance of the Government of Sebastian Lerdo de Tejada are responsible, guilty and morality, effective from the moment in which the guilty are situated in power of anyone force belonging to the regenerator army.
- Art. 9 – Generals, chiefs and officials who support the present plan by choice will be recognized in their assignments, rank and decorations.
- Art. 10 – Porfirio Díaz will be recognized as general in chief of the army.
- Art. 11 – Opportunely the general will be named, whose chief will enjoy extraordinary powers in administration and war.
- Art. 12 – It will not be possible to enter agreements with the enemy for any reason, under pain of death.
