= 1867 Mexican general election =

- October 1867
- Presidential election
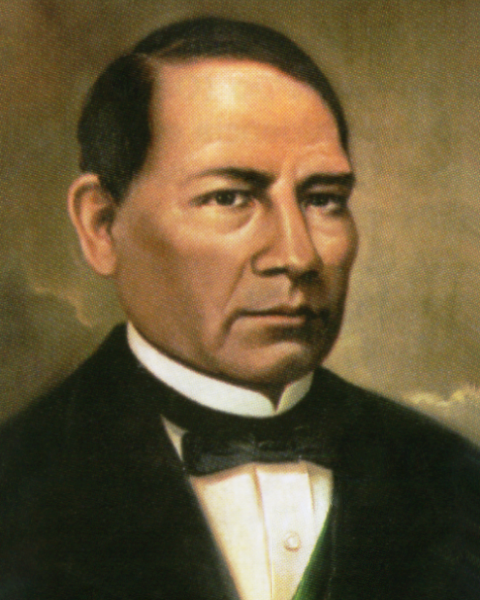

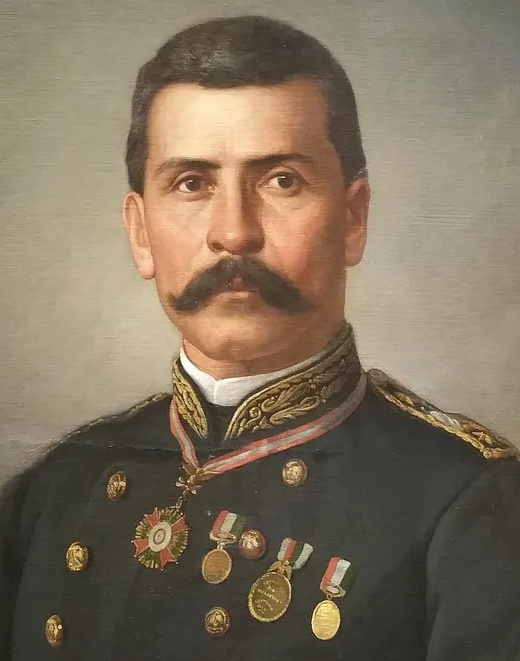
| Nominee | Benito Juárez | Porfirio Díaz |
| Popular vote | 7,422 | 2,709 |
| Percentage | 71.50% | 26.10 |
President before election
Benito Juárez
Elected President
Benito Juárez

General elections were held in Mexico in October, 1867. In the presidential election, incumbent president Benito Juárez was re-elected with 72% of the vote.

== Results ==
=== President ===
| Candidate | Votes | % |
|---|---|---|
| Benito Juárez | 7,422 | 71.50 |
| Porfirio Díaz | 2,709 | 26.10 |
| Other candidates | 249 | 2.40 |
| Total | 10,380 | 100.00 |
Source: Ramírez Rancaño
