= Plan de la Noria =

1871 call to oust Mexican president Benito Juárez by Porfirio Díaz

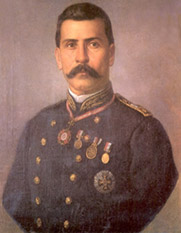
Porfirio Díaz in 1867

In the history of Mexico, the Plan de la Noria (from Spanish: "Plan of Noria") was a revolutionary call to arms intended to oust President Benito Juárez, who had been elected to a fourth term. Liberal General Porfirio Díaz issued it on 8 November 1871, immediately following his defeat by Juárez in the presidential election. Neither Juárez, Díaz, nor the third candidate, Sebastián Lerdo de Tejada, won a majority of votes. As a result, the Mexican Congress had to choose the victor; it was dominated by juaristas and elected Juárez to his fourth term.

Díaz drafted the Plan de la Noria demanding electoral freedom and no re-election. He gained some supporters from the army and enemies of Juárez, who supported Díaz for their own reasons. He was temporarily defeated by government forces in Oaxaca, where his brother Felix was killed.

After President Juárez died of a heart attack in July 1872, his successor, Chief Justice Sebastián Lerdo, assumed the presidency and pardoned the rebels in an effort to stabilize the country. Lerdo ran for re-election in 1876. Díaz declared another revolt under the Plan of Tuxtepec and overthrew the government.

== See also ==
- Plans in Mexican history
