= Sebastián Lerdo de Tejada =

President of Mexico from 1872 to 1876

The Most Excellent Sebastián Lerdo de Tejada
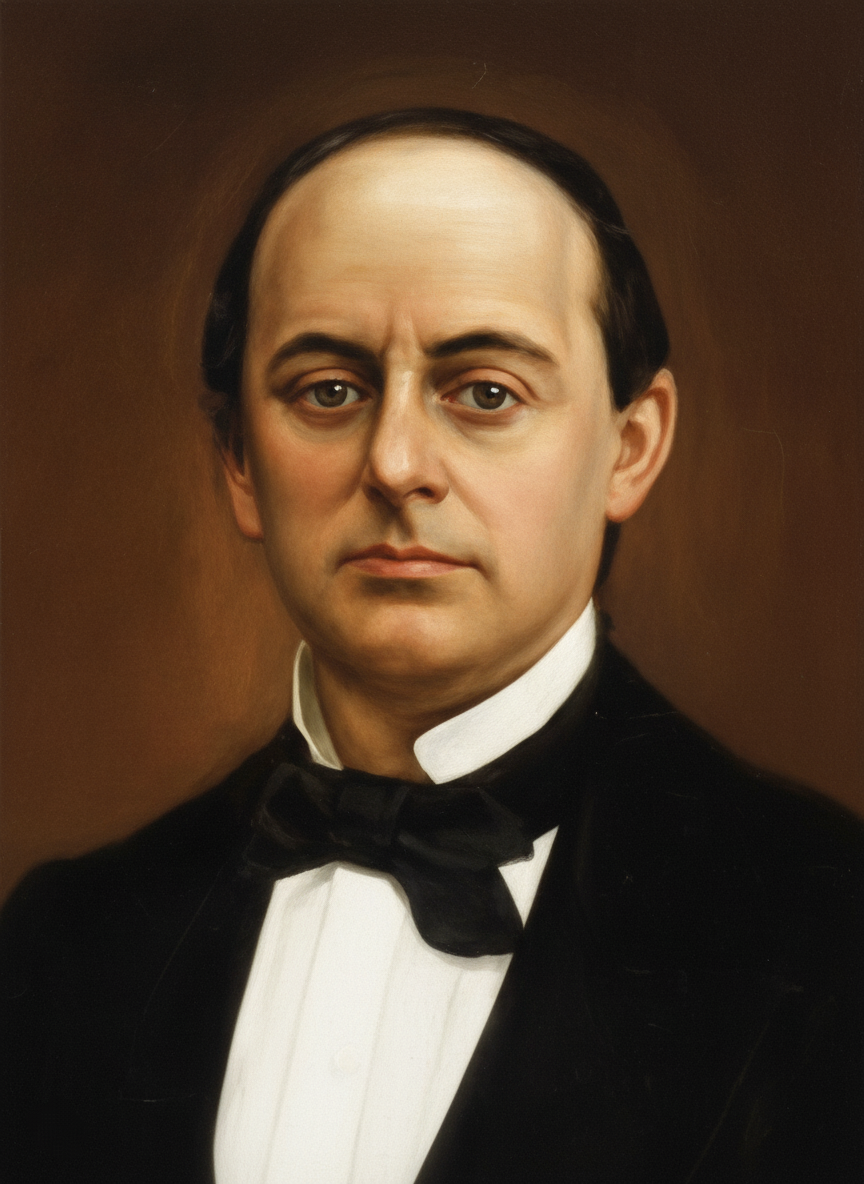

31st President of Mexico
- In office 19 July 1872 – 20 November 1876
- Preceded by: Benito Juárez
- Succeeded by: José María Iglesias

Personal details
- Born: Sebastián Lerdo de Tejada y Corral; 24 April 1823 Xalapa, Veracruz, Mexico
- Died: 21 April 1889 (aged 65) New York City, United States
- Resting place: Rotunda of Illustrious Persons
- Party: Liberal

Sebastián Lerdo de Tejada y Corral (Spanish pronunciation: [seβasˈtjan ˈleɾðo ðe teˈxaða]; 24 April 1823 – 21 April 1889) was a Mexican liberal politician and jurist who served as the 31st president of Mexico from 1872 to 1876.

A successor to Benito Juárez, who died in office in July 1872, Lerdo de Tejada was elected to his own presidential term in November 1872. Previously, he served as Chief Justice of the Supreme Court. Juárez's political rival, liberal General Porfirio Díaz, had attempted a coup against Juárez, but his Plan de la Noria failed and Díaz was eliminated as a political rival during Lerdo de Tejada's 1872–1876 term, giving him considerable leeway to pursue his program without political interference. During his term, he succeeded in pacifying the country after decades of political unrest and strengthening the Mexican state. He was elected for another term in 1876, but was overthrown by Porfirio Díaz and his supporters under the Plan of Tuxtepec, which asserted the principle of no-reelection to the presidency. Lerdo de Tejada died in exile in New York in 1889, but Díaz invited the return of his body to Mexico for burial with full honors. With the exception of Miguel Miramón, a contested president during the Reform War, he was the first Mexican head of state to be born after the country's independence.

== Early life and education ==
He was born in Xalapa, Veracruz, into a middle class Criollo family, the younger brother of Miguel Lerdo de Tejada. After studying theology as a scholarship student in the Palafoxiano Seminary in Puebla he received minor orders, but decided not to enter priesthood. In 1851 he earned a law degree from Colegio de San Ildefonso in Mexico City, a famed institution he began directing at the age of 29 (1852–1863).

== Political career ==
=== Early positions ===
In 1855, he served as a prosecutor before the Supreme Court. He became known as a Liberal leader and a supporter of President Benito Juárez. In 1857, he was minister of foreign affairs for three months under Ignacio Comonfort. He became the President of the Chamber of Deputies in 1861, 1862 and 1863. He opposed the Wyke-Zamacona Convention to resume debt payments to Britain. This convention was defeated in Congress.

During the French intervention and the reign of Maximilian I, he continued to be loyal to the Republicans, and had an active share in conducting the national resistance. In the face of the French invaders, the Republican government was forced to abandon the capital of Mexico City on 31 May 1863. The Republican government continued at one place or another within the country, but never left the country during Maximilian's reign.

On 12 September 1863 in San Luis Potosí, Lerdo de Tejada was named minister of foreign affairs, of the interior and of justice in Juárez's cabinet. He held these posts until 17 January 1871, 14 January 1868 and 11 September 1863, respectively. Throughout the French occupation and Maximilian's Second Empire, Lerdo de Tejada was President Juárez's closest ally and confident. On 8 November 1865, he signed the decree extending Juárez's term until the end of the war. In doing so, he opposed the claims of General Jesús González Ortega, who wished to succeed Juárez.

=== Restored Republic under Juárez ===
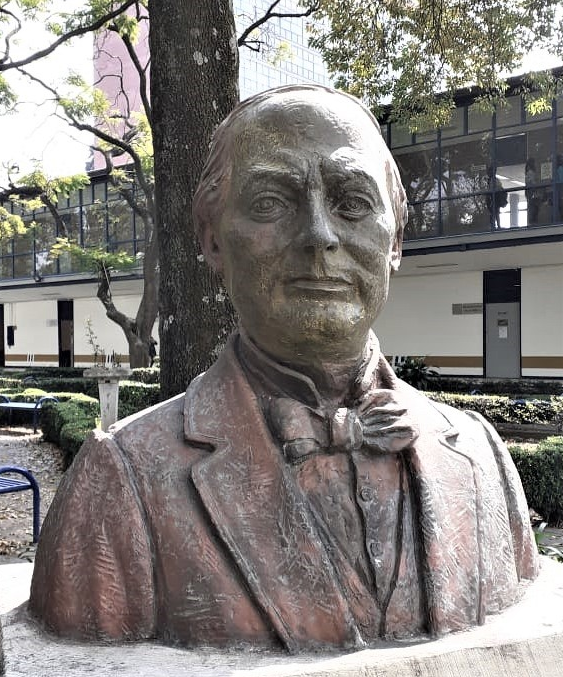
Sebastián Lerdo de Tejada

Upon the triumph of the Republic in 1867, Lerdo de Tejada, "according to some sources ... convinced Juárez not to pardon Maximilian," who was executed in Querétaro along with two Mexicans loyal to the emperor. Once the Republicans were returned to power, Lerdo de Tejada simultaneously became minister of foreign affairs, minister of the interior, a deputy in Congress and president of the Supreme Court. Lerdo de Tejada aided Juárez's push to centralize the power of the federal government and opposing the use of violence against local forces of opposition. Lerdo de Tejada was key for construction of what became a liberal political machine in this era. He became involved with state politics to gain political allies for the federal centralizing state.

In 1871, he was a candidate for president of the Republic, running against Juárez and Porfirio Díaz. He came in third in the race against the president who kept the republic intact during the French intervention and one of the Mexican military heroes of republican resistance. Following Juárez's victory he returned to the Supreme Court. Díaz revolted against Juárez opposing the president's continuation in power in the Plan de la Noria. The revolt was defeated and Díaz sent into political exile, allowing the last of Juárez's term relatively free of political conflict. With Juárez's death caused by a heart attack in July 1872, Lerdo de Tejada was the constitutional successor to the presidency.

=== As president ===
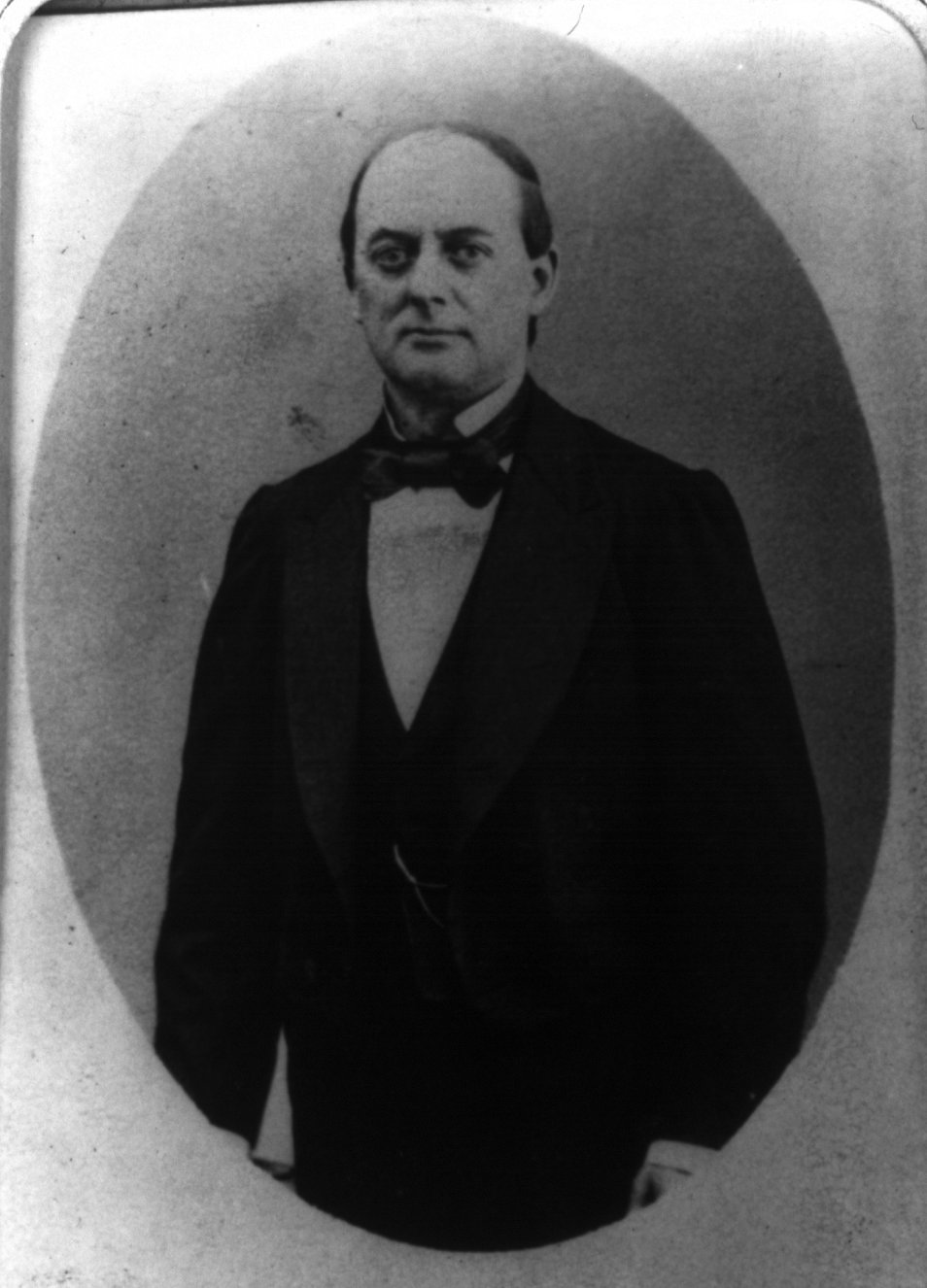
Photo of Lerdo de Tejada, c.1870s-1880s

This made him interim president, but he held elections and held the office in his own right. To the surprise of most, Lerdo de Tejada kept Juárez's cabinet basically unchanged and promulgated a limited amnesty law. To his supporters, he offered immediate spoils. He declared that he exercised his power as president, not as head of a party.

Although he sought peace, order, and respect for the law, he used the armed force of the state to achieve those goals. During his term, he achieved success in pacifying the country, particularly in eliminating regional caudillo Manuel Lozada of Tepic. Lozada had a regional fiefdom and maintained power by alliances with the French and following their expulsion, Juárez could not dislodge Lozada from power. Lerdo de Tejada was able to use federal troops to crush Lozada; Liberal General Ramón Corona defeated and executed Lozada at La Mojonera.

Lerdo de Tejada continued projects initiated by Juárez, most visibly the construction of railways. He opened the first railway line in Mexico from the port of Veracruz to the capital Mexico City, which was begun by Juárez and Lerdo de Tejada inaugurated in January 1873. However, Lerdo de Tejada had seemingly contradictory policies about railway construction. He was concerned about U.S. encroachment in northern Mexico and resisted construction of railways to the border. He is quoted as saying, "Between strength and weakness, the desert," meaning the weakness of Mexico vis-à-vis the U.S. and the desert as a useful barrier. After a delay, he attempted to have a Mexican company construct the north–south line to the U.S. border, but the effort failed. Ultimately, he did approve a proposal of U.S. railway entrepreneur Edward Lee Plumb to build the line. Mexican supporters of construction thought Lerdo had delayed too long and botched the chance of Mexicans building the line, while Lerdo de Tejada's opponents viewed him as caving to the U.S.

The Laws of the Reform were incorporated into a new Constitution (25 September 1873). The Sisters of Charity were expelled from the country. In 1874, four small steamships of war were acquired for the customs service. Lerdo de Tejada also reestablished the Senate.

=== The end of the Restored Republic ===
Lerdo de Tejada ran for a second term in 1876, which gave opponents the grounds to oppose him on the principle of "no reelection." At this point, Porfirio Díaz, who had been neutralized politically with his unsuccessful revolt against Juárez in 1872, now believed he had the grounds to challenge Lerdo de Tejada, which were articulated in the Plan of Tuxtepec. The plan was issued prior to the July 24, 1876 election, which Lerdo de Tejada won. Some charged that the victory was fraudulent, but perhaps no more so than its predecessors. Lerdo de Tejada did not muzzle the free press, which printed the accusations and began to call for open rebellion. The President of the Supreme Court, José María Iglesias did declare the election fraudulent, a ruling which put him as successor to the presidency.

Lerdo de Tejada had made himself unpopular by the means he took to secure his re-election, by his disposition to limit state rights in favor of a strongly-centralized government, and because of measures such as the expulsion of the Sisters of Charity. His forces were defeated by Díaz in the decisive Battle of Tecoac on 16 November 1876. Díaz assumed the presidency on 28 November 1876. José María Iglesias also claimed the presidency, by virtue of his position as president of the Supreme Court (31 October 1876). Díaz went on to defeat Iglesias as well.

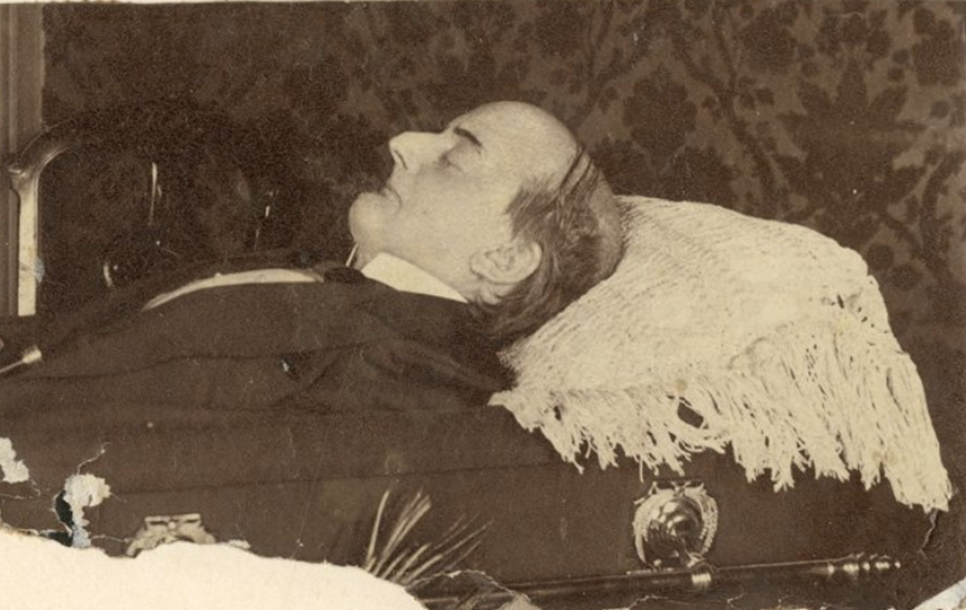
Lerdo de Tejada in his casket

Lerdo de Tejada went into exile in New York City, where he died in 1889. On the orders of his former rival, President Díaz, his body was returned to Mexico and buried in Mexico with full honors, in the Rotonda of Illustrious Men. At the funeral, there was barely a mention of the reasons for Lerdo de Tejada's ouster and exile. With Lerdo de Tejada's overthrow, historians have marked this as the end of the Restored Republic and the beginning of the Porfiriato, which lasted from 1876–1911 until the outbreak of the Mexican Revolution.

== Legacy ==
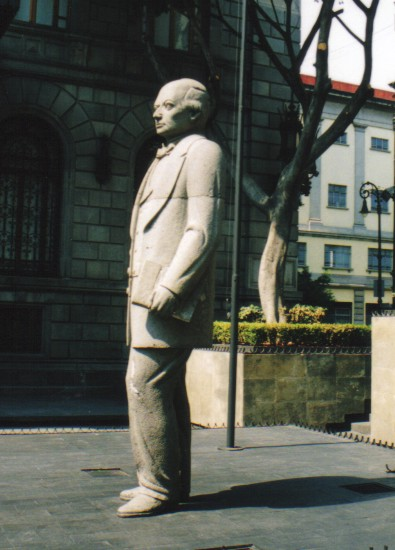
Monument to Sebastián Lerdo de Tejada in front of the Mexican Congress.

Lerdo de Tejada's principal biographer in English, Frank Averill Knapp, titled his work, The Life of Sebastián Lerdo de Tejada, 1823–1889: a study of influence and obscurity, an indication of Lerdo's ambiguous legacy. He says "No Mexican President has been more maligned, misunderstood, and misrepresented" than Lerdo de Tejada. He did not have the implacable tenacity of Juárez nor the military achievements and political longevity of Porfirio Díaz, both of indigenous heritage from Oaxaca. But Lerdo de Tejada's presidency was a continuation of the policies of the Liberal Reform, whose laws could be implemented in times of relative peace. As such, he can be seen as one in a line of liberals aiming to modernize Mexico. A statue of Lerdo de Tejada stands outside the Mexican Congress. The city of Toluca de Lerdo was named after Lerdo de Tejada; however, the city is more commonly referred to as "Toluca".

== Cabinet ==
- Defense (Guerra y Marina):
  - Ignacio Mejía (July 19, 1872 – August 30, 1876).
  - Mariano Escobedo (August 31, 1876 – November 20, 1876).
- Finance (Hacienda):
  - Francisco Mejía (July 19, 1872 – November 20, 1876).
- Foreign Affairs (Relaciones Exteriores):
  - José María Lafragua (July 19, 1872 – November 15, 1875).
  - Juan de Dios Arias (November 15, 1875 – August 30, 1876).
  - Manuel Romero Rubio (August 31, 1876 – November 20; 1876).
- Industry and Commerce (Fomento):
  - Blas Balcárcel (July 19, 1872 – November 20, 1876).
- Interior (Gobernación):
  - Cayetano Gómez Pérez (July 19, 1872 – September 26, 1876).
  - Juan José Baz (September 27, 1876 – November 20; 1876).
- Justice (Justicia):
  - Ramón I. Alcázar (July 19, 1872 – November 20, 1876).

== See also ==
- List of heads of state of Mexico
- History of Mexico

Political offices
Preceded by Benito Juárez	President of Mexico; 19 July 1872 - 31 October 1876	Succeeded by José María Iglesias
