= 1910 Mexican general election =

- 26 June and 10 July 1910
- Presidential election
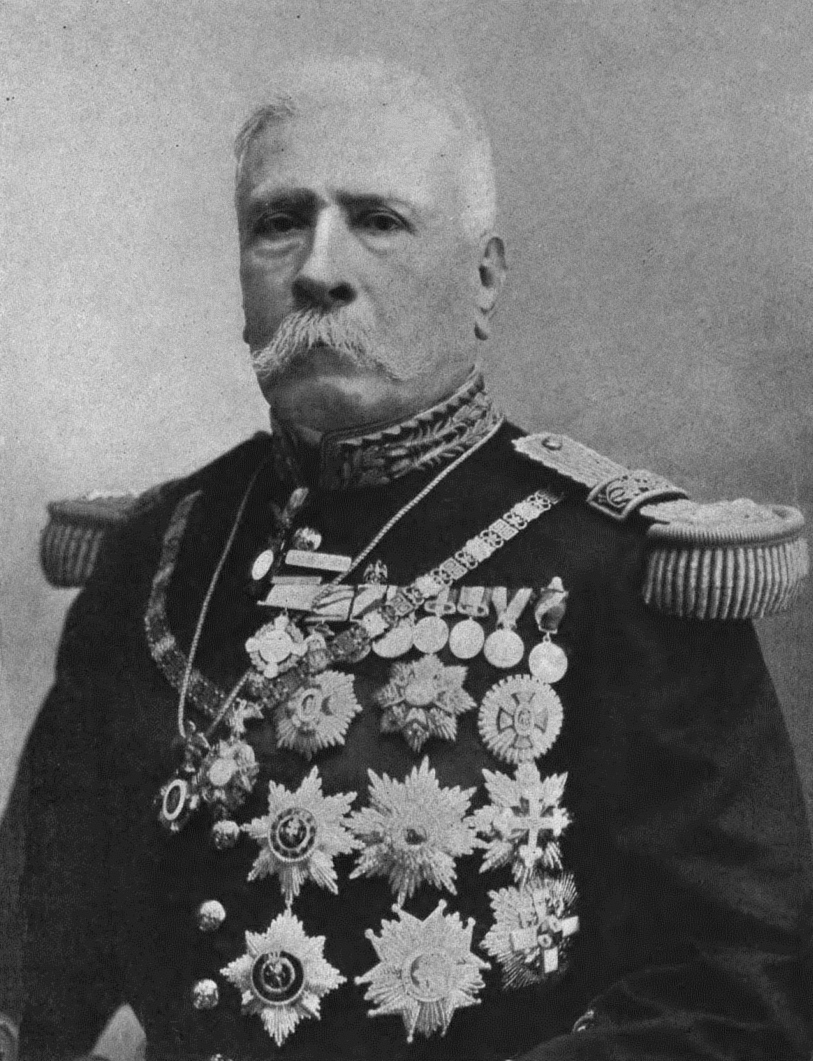

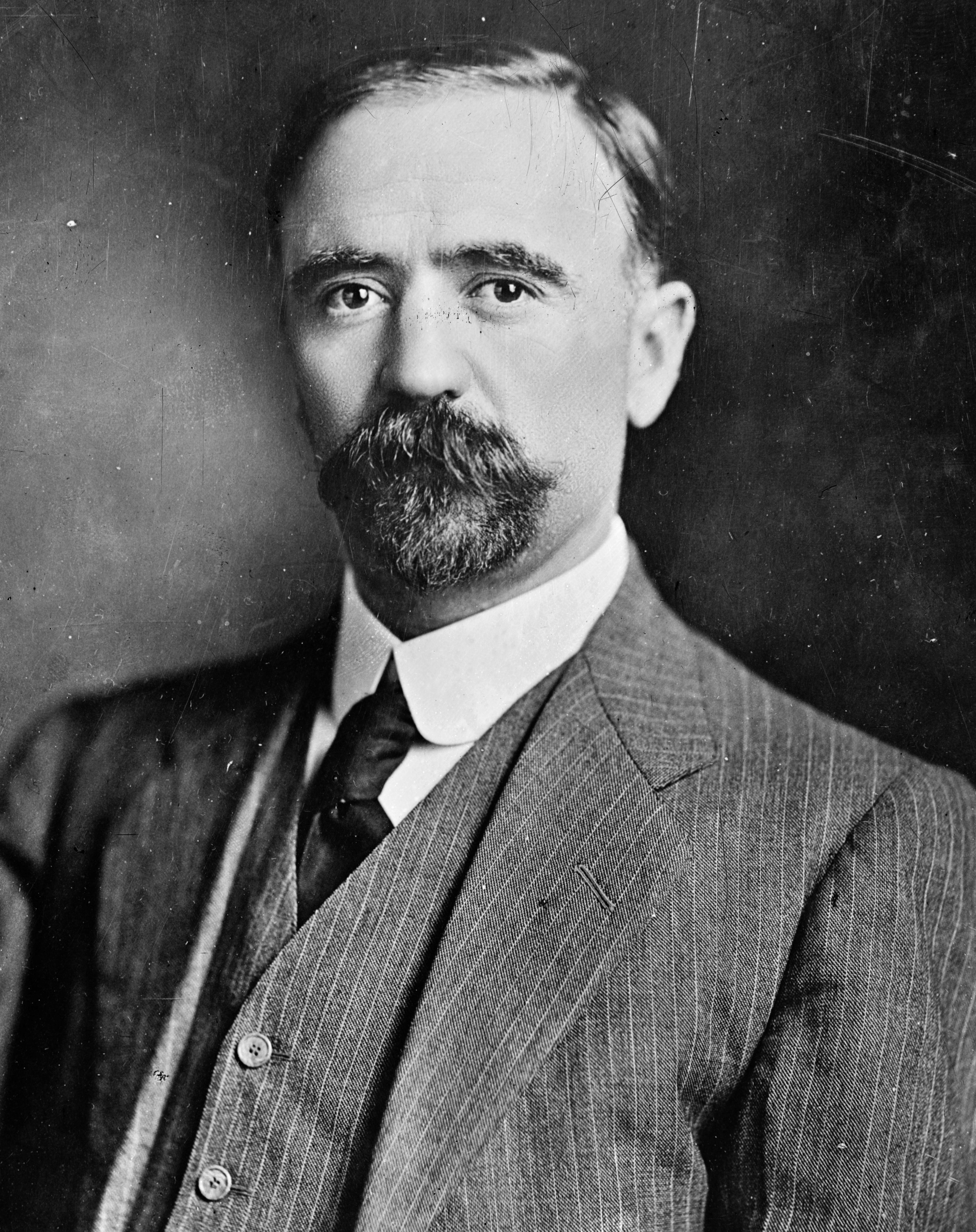
Nominee	Porfirio Díaz	Francisco I. Madero
Party	National Reelectionist	National Antireelectionist
Popular vote	18,625	196
Percentage	98.93%	1.04%
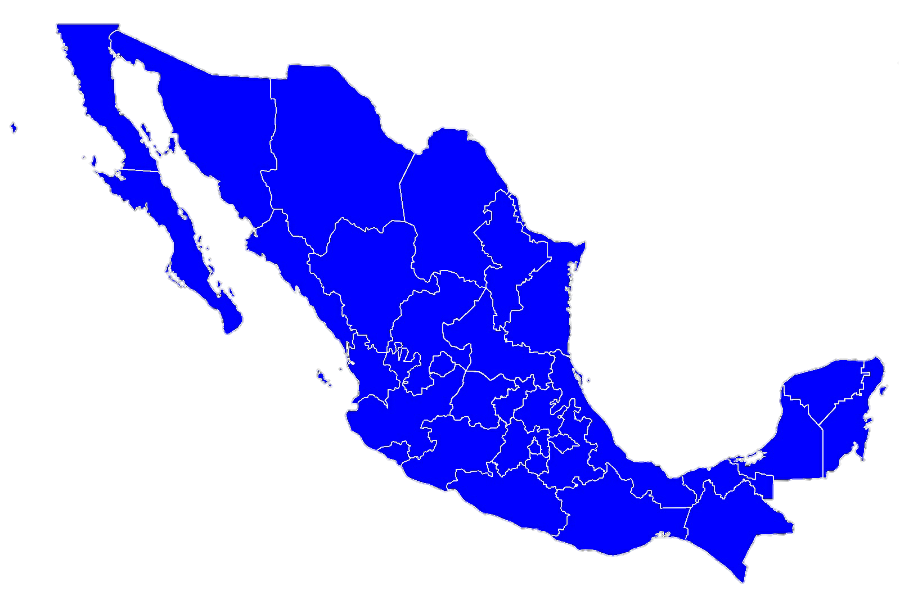
- States won by Díaz
President before election
Porfirio Díaz
National Reelectionist
Elected President
Porfirio Díaz
National Reelectionist

General elections were held in Mexico on 26 June and 10 July 1910.

The contested election instigated the beginning of the Mexican Revolution and preceded the end of the 35-year period of Mexican history known as the Porfiriato.

== Background ==
Porfirio Díaz, a liberal general who had distinguished himself during the War of Reform and resistance to French intervention, seized control of the Mexican government from Sebastian Lerdo de Tejada in an 1876 coup d'état, in which Díaz and other Mexican military officials explicitly opposed presidential re-election. Díaz served one term as president before nominally making way for Manuel Gonzalez, a political ally. Despite his earlier criticism of the practice, Díaz himself was re-elected to the presidency in 1884, 1888, 1892, 1896, 1900 and 1904.

Most historians categorize the Díaz regime during this period, known as the Porfiriato, as a dictatorship. Formal political opposition did not exist.

While Díaz himself has been characterized as a liberal and political pragmatist, his regime was dominated by technocratic intellectuals, known as los cientificos, inspired by the works of Auguste Comte and Herbert Spencer. During the Porfiriato, authority was centralized in the federal government, which pursued a policy of foreign direct investment, urbanization, liberalization of social attitudes, and rapid technological development. Through conciliation with local political bosses and repressive policies, including the expropriation of indigenous land for the development of railways and haciendas (often owned by foreign investors) and expansion of the internal police force known as the rurales, the Díaz regime established a period of relative internal stability in Mexico following a period of warfare and turmoil. Through generous concessions to investors, Díaz pursued conciliation with the United States and resolution of border disputes.

=== Creelman interview ===
In 1908, President Díaz consented to an interview by the American journalist James Creelman for Pearson's Magazine at Chapultepec Castle. During the interview, Díaz praised democratic principles, arguing that certain repressive and anti-democratic measures had only been necessary to develop political consciousness in a population that was apolitical and illiterate. "Our difficulty has been that the people do not concern themselves enough about public matters for a democracy," Díaz said in the interview. "Capacity for self-restraint is the basis of democratic government, and self-restraint is possible only to those who recognize the rights of their neighbors. The Indians, who are more than half our population, care little for politics. They are accustomed to look to those in authority for leadership instead of thinking for themselves. That is a tendency they inherited from the Spaniards." Díaz credited his own regime with the establishment of a middle class which would support democratic government in the future.

When confronted by Creelman with the question of his own re-election, Díaz said,

“It is true there is no opposition party. I have so many friends in the republic that my enemies seem unwilling to identify themselves with so small a minority. I appreciate the kindness of my friends and the confidence of my country; but such absolute confidence imposes responsibilities and duties that tire me more and more. No matter what my friends and supporters say, I retire when my present term of office ends, and I shall not serve again. I shall be eighty years old then. My country has relied on me and it has been kind to me. My friends have praised my merits and overlooked my faults. But they may not be willing to deal so generously with my successor and he may need my advice and support; therefore I desire to be alive when he assumes office so that I may help him. I welcome an opposition party in the Mexican Republic. If it appears, I will regard it as a blessing, not as an evil. And if it can develop power, not to exploit but to govern, I will stand by it, support it, advise it and forget myself in the successful inauguration of complete democratic government in the country. It is enough for me that I have seen Mexico rise among the peaceful and useful nations. I have no desire to continue in the Presidency. This nation is ready for her ultimate life of freedom. At the age of seventy-seven years, I am satisfied with robust health. That is one thing which neither law nor force can create. I would not exchange it for all the millions of your American oil king.”

After its publication in Pearson's in March 1908, the Creelman interview was translated and published by El Imparcial. Immediately, several groups in both opposition and support of the government put forward candidates, including Governor of Nuevo León Bernardo Reyes.

== Campaign ==
The 1910 election was intended to be the first free election of the Porfiriato, but after opposition leader Francisco I. Madero appeared poised to upset the Porfirian regime, Madero was arrested and imprisoned before the election was held.

=== Gallery ===
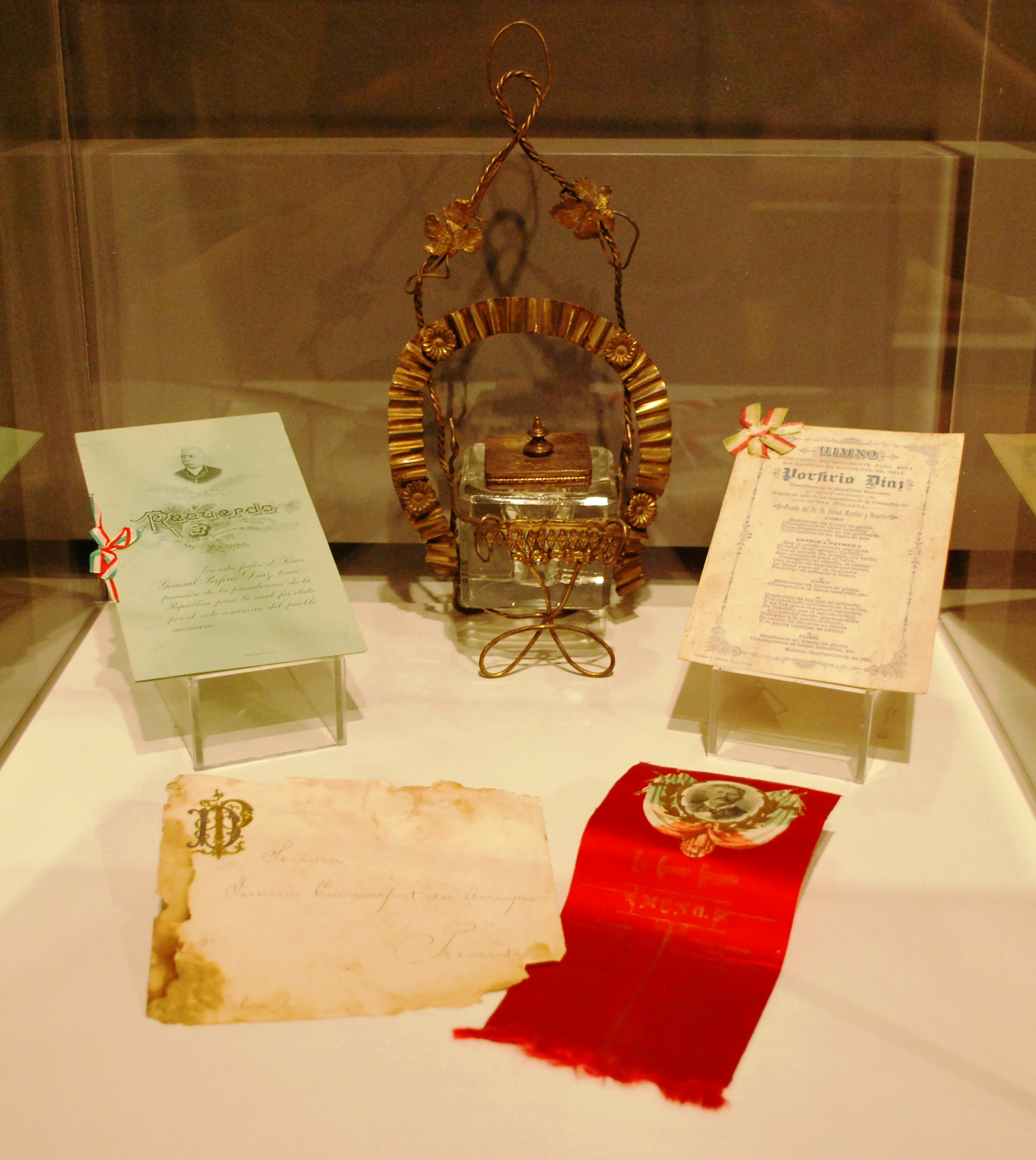
Díaz campaign items.

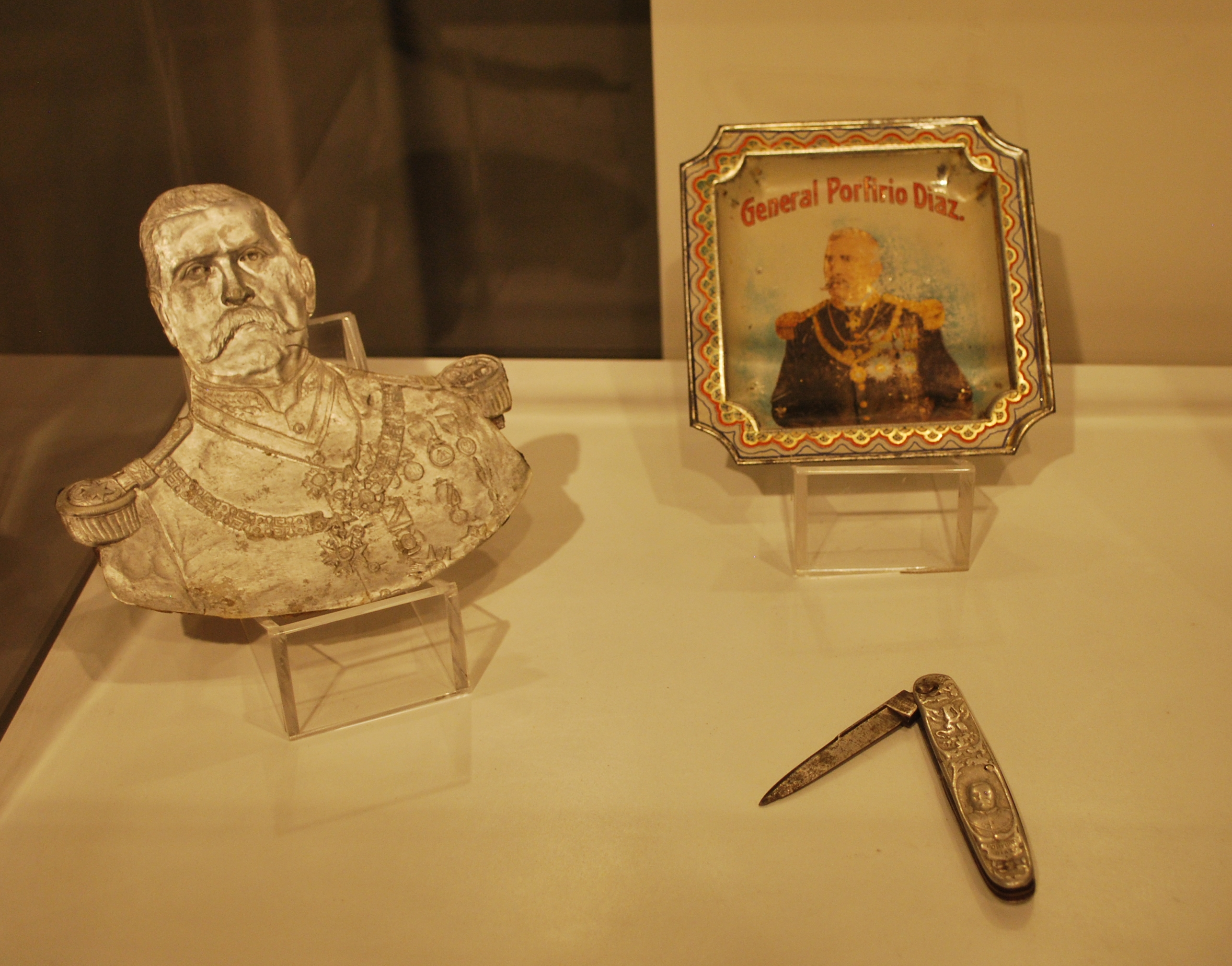
Díaz campaign items.

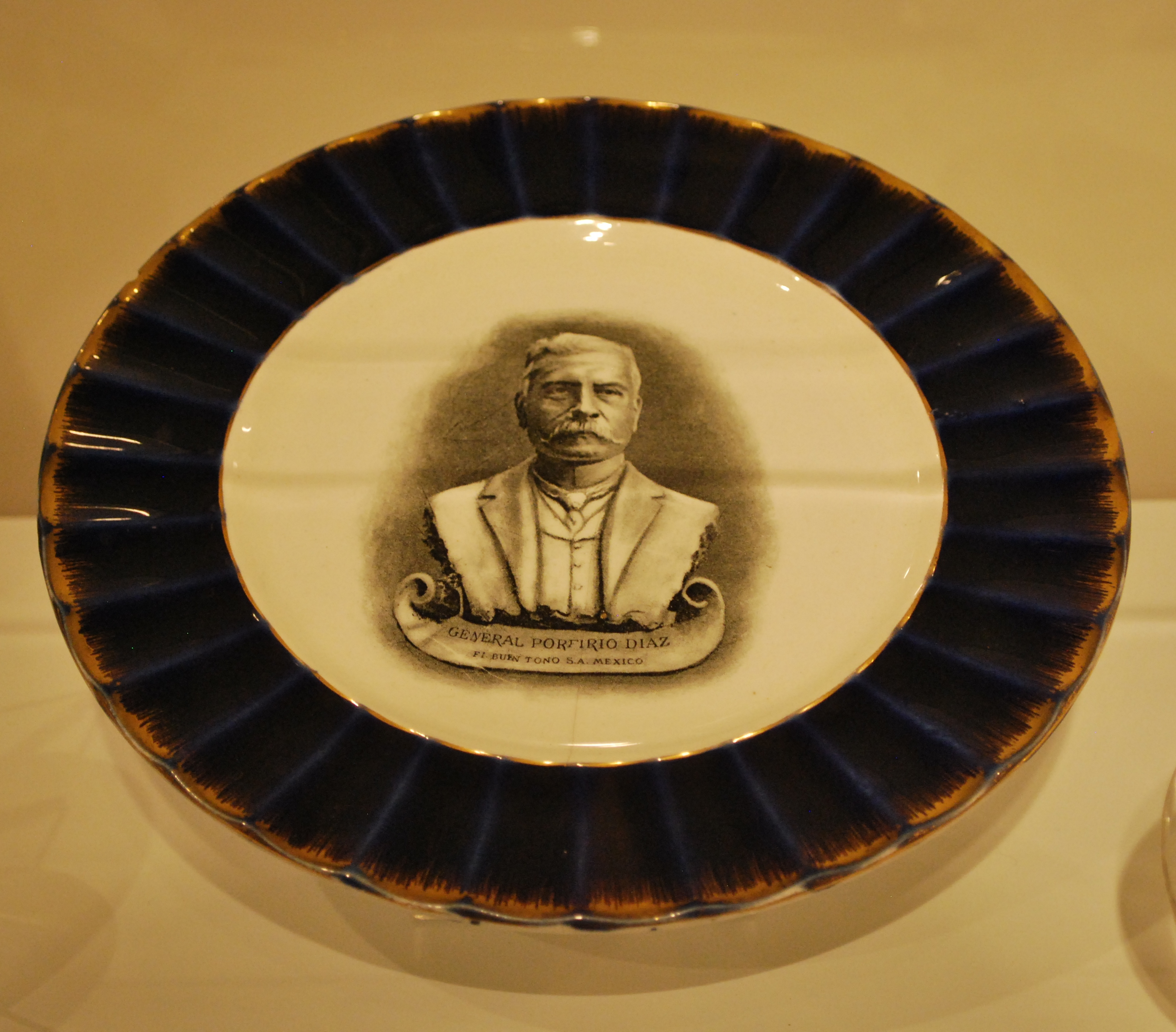
Díaz campaign plate.

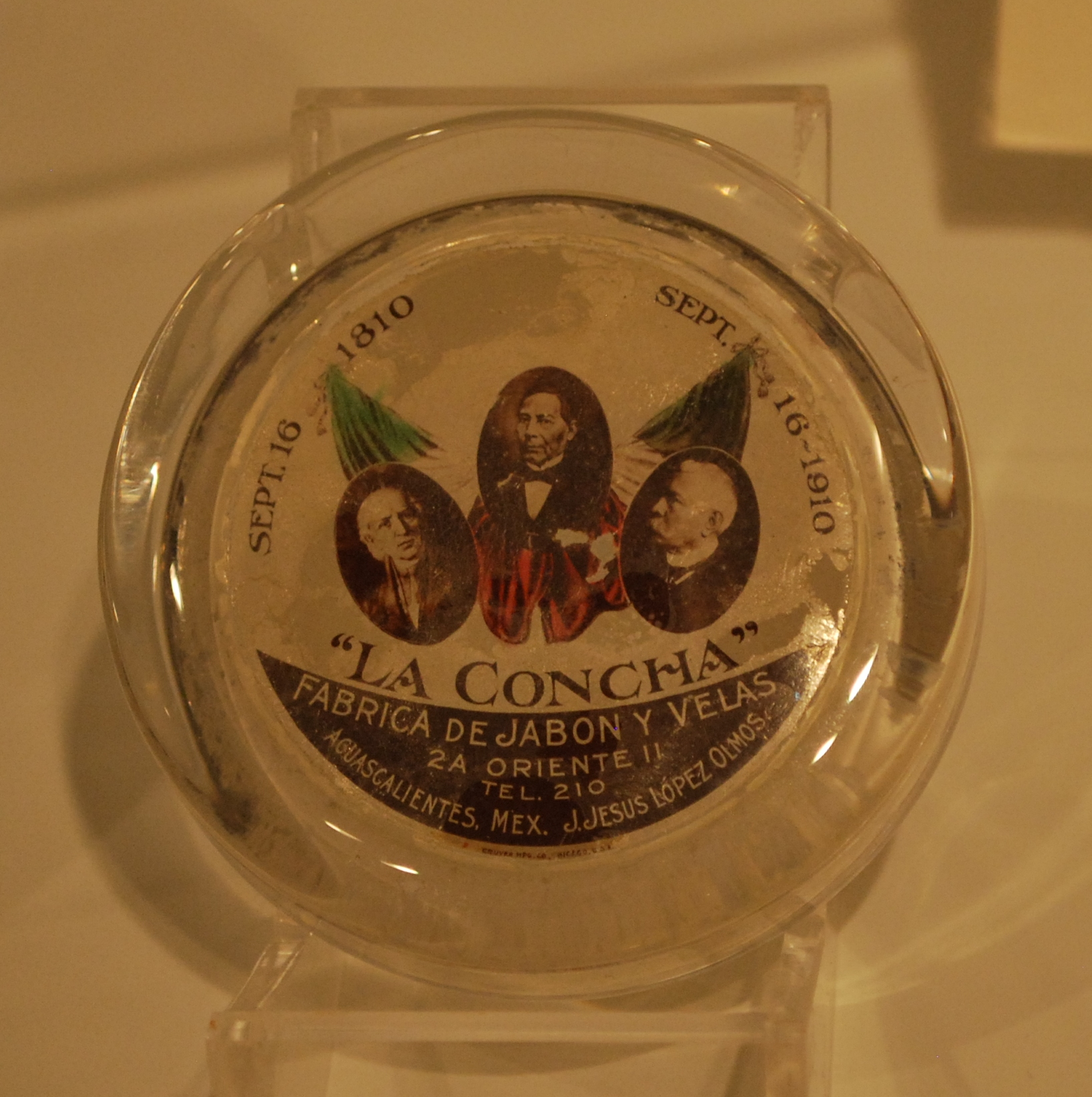
Díaz campaign ashtray.

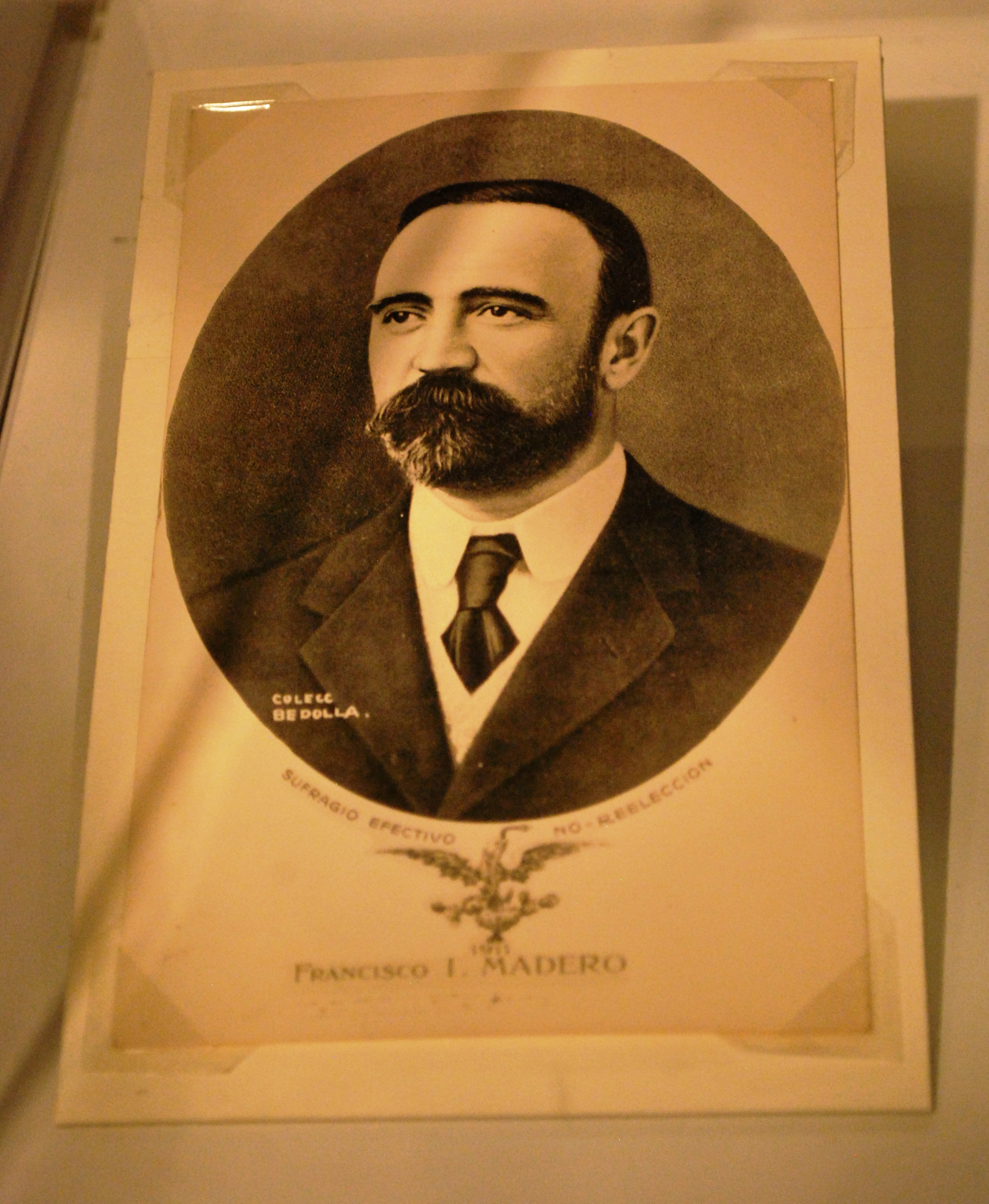
Madero campaign photograph.

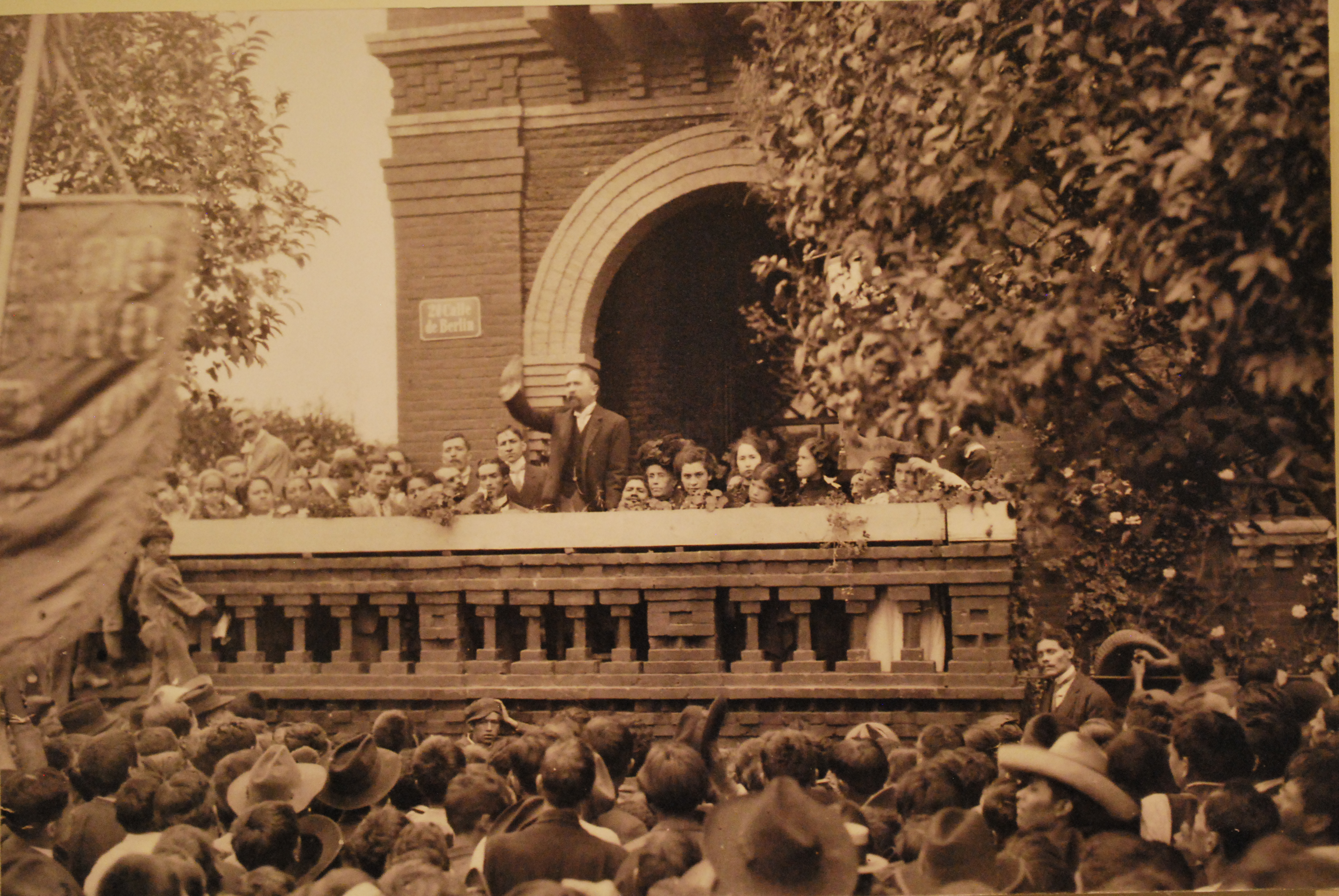
Madero speaking at a campaign rally in Mexico City.

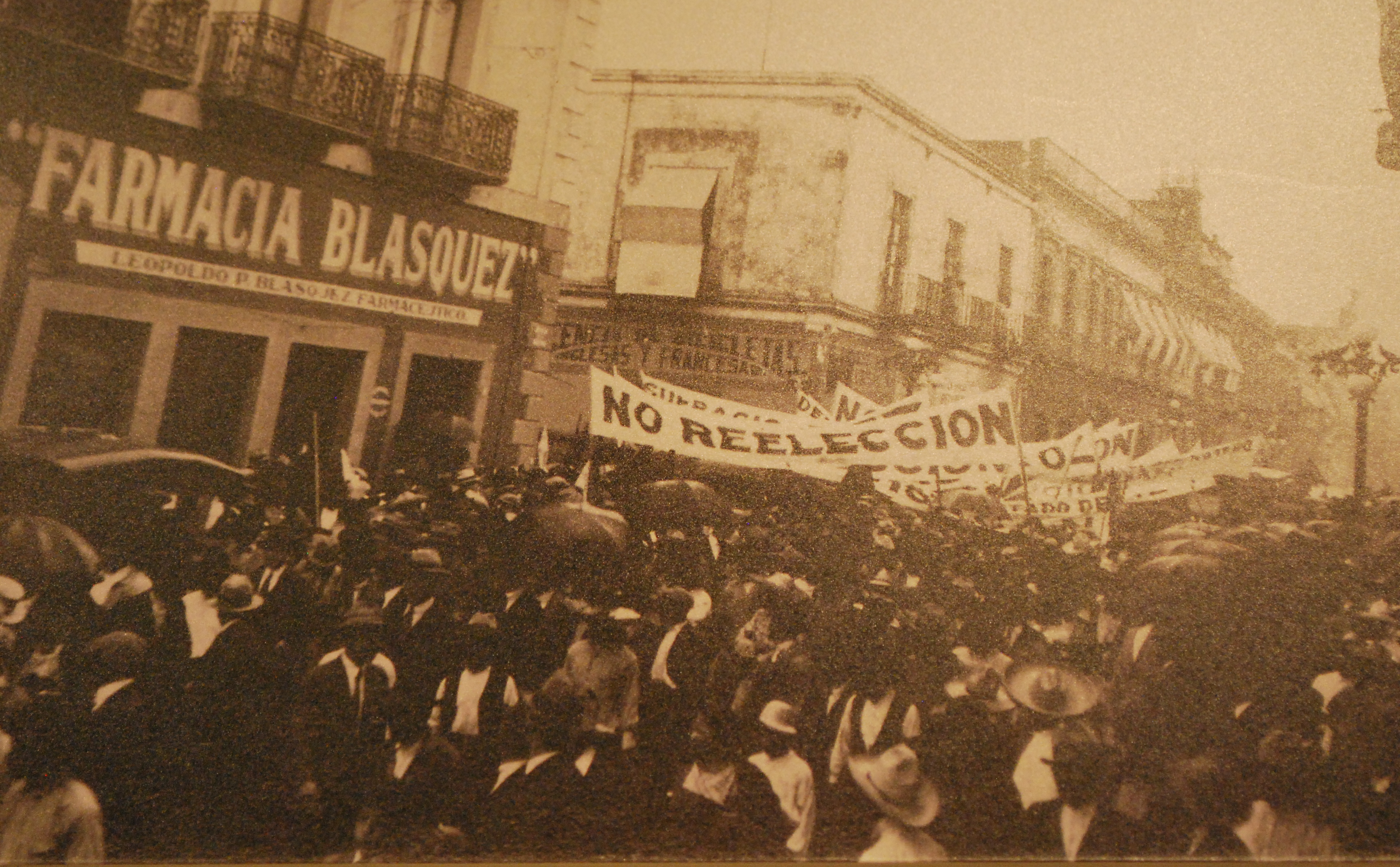
Rally in support of Madero.

== Results ==
Despite Madero's popularity, Díaz was controversially announced as the election winner with almost 99% of the votes.

=== President ===
Candidate	Party	Votes	%
Porfirio Díaz	National Reelectionist Party	18,625	98.93
Francisco I. Madero	National Antireelectionist Party	196	1.04
Valentin Resendis	Independent	2	0.01
José Yves Limantour	National Reelectionist Party	1	0.01
Teodoro A. Dehesa Méndez	National Unionist Party	1	0.01
Vicente Sánchez G.	Independent	1	0.01
Total		18,826	100.00
Source: González Casanova

=== Vice-President ===
Candidate	Votes	%
Ramón Corral	17,177	91.36
Teodoro A. Dehesa Méndez	1,394	7.41
Francisco Vázquez Gómez	187	0.99
Bernardo Reyes	12	0.06
Nicolás Zúñiga y Miranda	1	0.01
Francisco I. Madero	1	0.01
Other candidates	30	0.16
Total	18,802	100.00
Source: González Casanova

== Aftermath ==
In October 1910, Madero published the Plan of San Luis Potosí, inciting the Mexican Revolution. Díaz was forced to resign from office on May 25, 1911, and left for exile in Spain on May 31. Ultimately, Madero was recognized as president but later assassinated in February 1913 during La Decena Trágica. Díaz died in Paris in 1915.
