= Nicolás Zúñiga y Miranda =

Mexican politician (1865–1925)

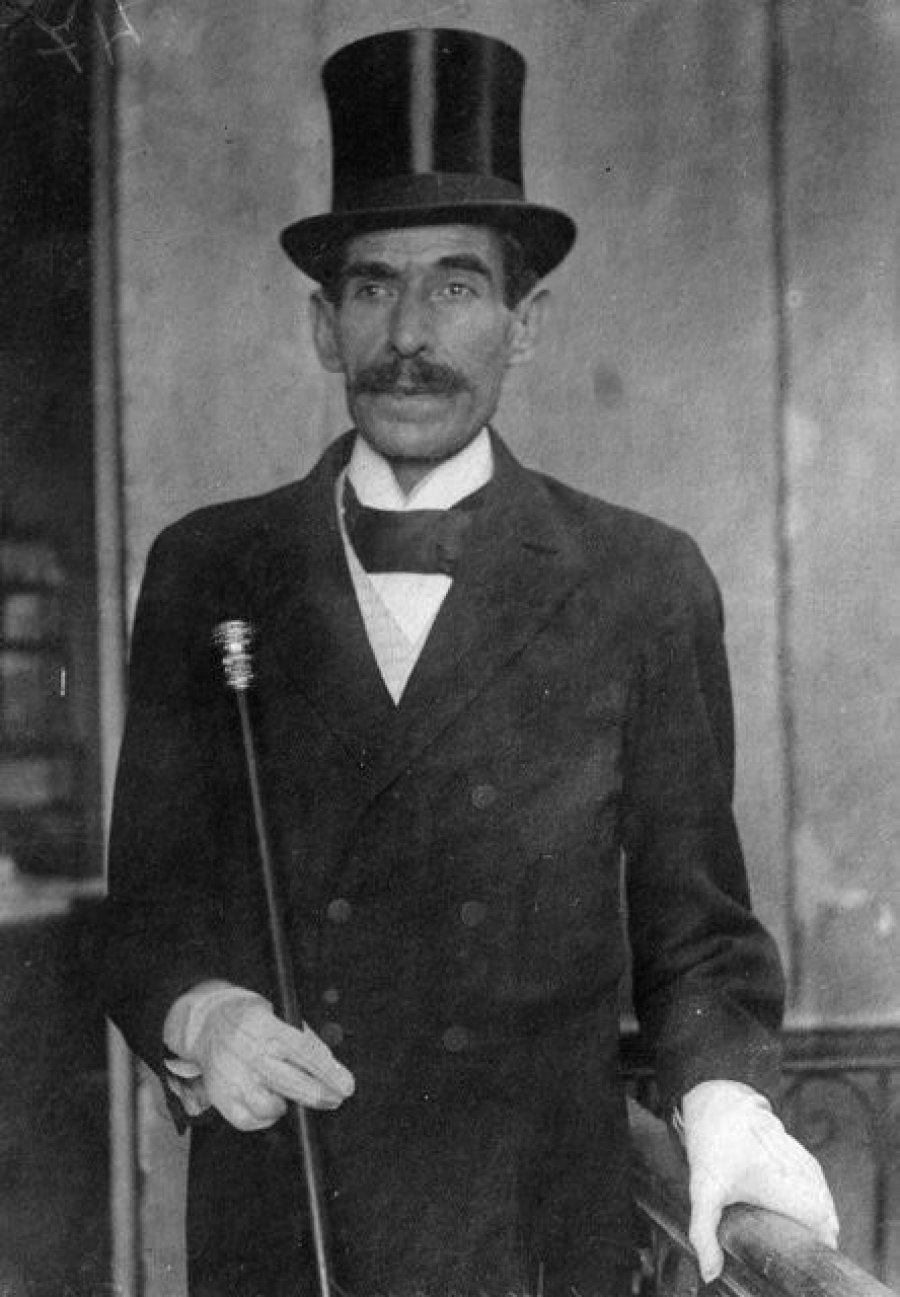
Zúñiga y Miranda

Nicolás Zúñiga y Miranda (13 May 1865 – 29 March 1925) was a Mexican eccentric who was a perennial candidate in multiple presidential elections from 1896 to 1924. He considered himself the legitimate president of Mexico despite never winning any of the elections. Prior to his political career he made earthquake predictions.

== Early life ==
Nicolás Zúñiga y Miranda was born in Zacatecas to an elite family. He was tutored starting at age 3, including by a priest. He was sent to Mexico City by his father at age 16 to study law. Upon arriving in Mexico City he mistakenly rented a room in a love hotel and came to the aid of a woman who he thought was under attack, but was instead engaged in sexual roleplay. He went around the streets of Mexico City and gave interviews, speeches, and prognostications.

Other students in Mexico City regarded Zúñiga as eccentric. He took up astronomy as a hobby and made failed predictions for comets and floods. He invented a seismometer that he claimed could predict earthquakes. In May 1887, he predicted that an earthquake would happen in Oaxaca on 24 May. El Siglo XIX published a story about the prediction and Zúñiga's biography. Tremors occurred in Oaxaca on that day and Zúñiga's father purchased 1,000 copies of the El Siglo XIX issue covering Zúñiga. He predicted another earthquake and four volcanic eruptions would happen on 10 August and that it would kill everybody in Mexico, but this did not occur.

In the early 1890s Zúñiga was arrested for conspiracy against the government and sentenced to one year imprisonment in San Juan de Ulúa. This sentence was upheld by the Supreme Court of Mexico on 16 June 1894.

== Politics ==
Zúñiga ran in the 1896 election and was supported by university students and his former classmates as a way to mock Porfirio Díaz. His platform called for land reform by selling small plots on credit with payment happening ten years later, eliminating the production of pulque to combat alcoholism, and giving people European styled clothing. Journalists who supported the Liberal Party accused Zúñiga of making a mockery of politics. The police arrested Zúñiga for drunk and disorderly conduct and issued a four peso fine with a night in jail. Zúñiga created the newspaper La Voz Zúñiguista after being released from prison and was imprisoned for six months after publishing an article titled "I Am the President".

Zúñiga ran in the 1900, 1904, 1910, 1911, 1917, 1920, and 1924 elections. He offered to help Bernardo Reyes in the 1910 election, but Reyes declined his offer. In the 1920 election he received 34 votes in Mexico City compared to Álvaro Obregón's 40,232 votes. Zúñiga proclaimed himself the legitimate president despite losing every election he ran in.

Zúñiga ran to represent Hidalgo in the Congress of the Union in 1918.

== Personal life and legacy ==
Zúñiga was noted for his odd appearance due to his thin frame, drooping moustache, and his style of dress that was from the old Mexican elite rather than modern fashion. He frequently wore a sombrero and frock coat. He believed in spiritualism and claimed that he directly talked to Aristotle, who told him to negotiate the end of World War I. He died in La Merced, Mexico City on 29 March 1925.

Diego Rivera included Zúñiga in his mural Dream of a Sunday Afternoon in Alameda Park. Juan Bustillo Oro included Zúñiga as a character in his 1944 film My Memories of Mexico.

== Works cited ==
=== Books ===
- Beezley, William; Ewell, Judith, eds. (1997). The Human Tradition in Modern Latin America. Scholarly Resources. ISBN 0842026126.

=== Journals ===
- Campuzano, Javier (2010). "Elecciones Federales y Transición a un Nuevo Régimen: México, 1920 y 1922. Estudios de Caso". Historia Mexicana. 60 (2). El Colegio de México: 1119–1174. doi:10.2307/25758295. JSTOR 25758295.

=== News ===
- "Charged With Conspiracy". New Orleans Times-Democrat. 17 June 1894. p. 4 – via Newspapers.com.
- "D. Nicolas de Zuniga y Miranda Quiere Ser Diputado". La Prensa. 15 June 1918. p. 4 – via Newspapers.com.
- ""Perpetual Candidate" For Presidency of Mexico Succumbs". Houston Chronicle. 30 March 1925. p. 11 – via Newspapers.com.
- "Shake! The Flash Prophet Fails in His Predictions". The Times-Picayune. 22 August 1887. p. 2 – via Newspapers.com.
- "Sunbeams". The New York Herald. 7 April 1883. p. 2 – via Newspapers.com.
- Losser, Sheryl (13 June 2023). "Huckster, madman, candidate: the unusual life of Nicolás Zuñiga". Mexico Daily News. Archived from the original on 27 May 2026.
