= 1904 Mexican general election =

- 11 July 1904
- Presidential election
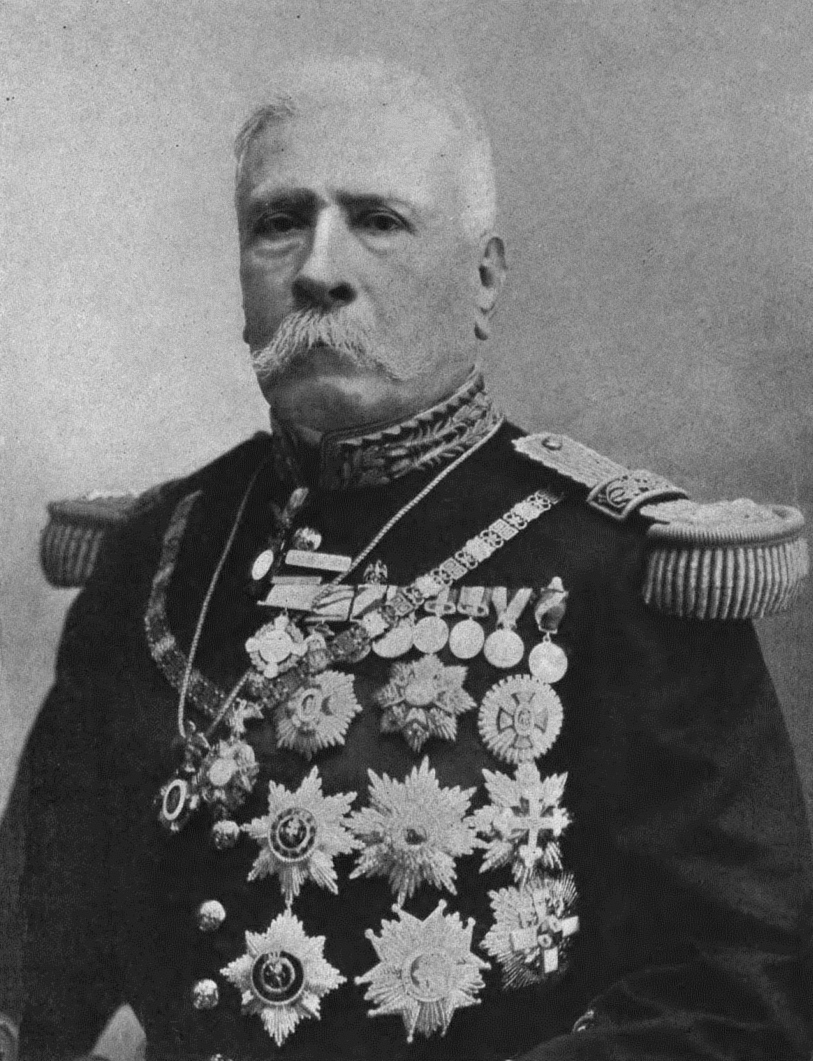

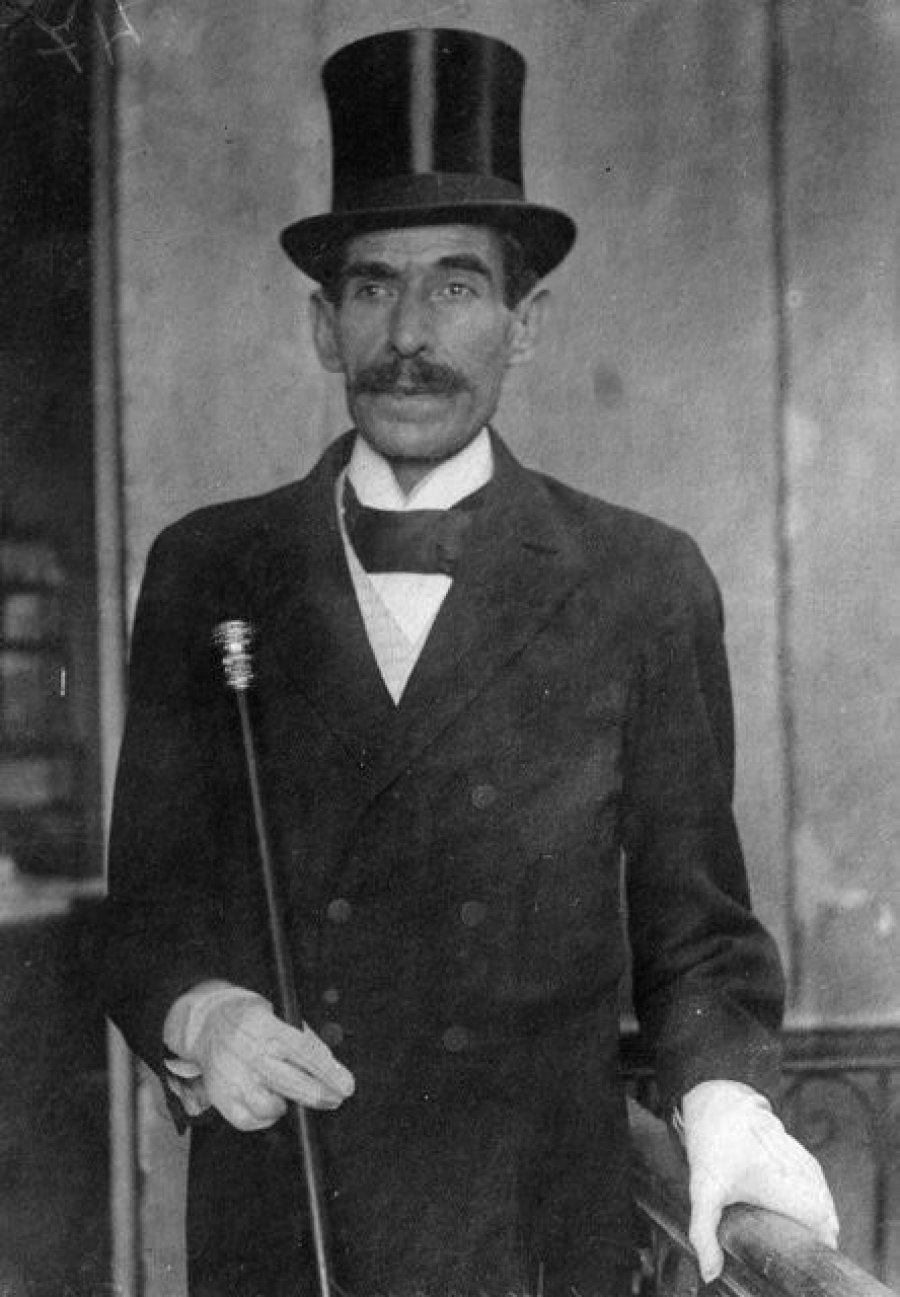
Nominee	Porfirio Díaz	Nicolás Zúñiga y Miranda
Running mate	Ramón Corral	None
Popular vote	19,008	0
Percentage	100%	0%
President before election
Porfirio Díaz
Elected President
Porfirio Díaz

General elections were held in Mexico on 11 July 1904. Incumbent Porfirio Díaz was the only serious candidate for the presidency, and was re-elected with 100% of the vote. Ramón Corral became the first Mexican vice president in decades, and the first elected via popular vote. The only other presidential candidate, the perennial Nicolás Zúñiga y Miranda, received no votes.

The election took place during the period known as the Porfiriato. Díaz, who had held the presidency since 1884 and twice before then, had established a dictatorial regime. His advisors, the Científicos, urged him to reestablish the position of vice president, which he did, and the nomination went to Corral, his secretary of the interior. On the day of the election, the victory of the Díaz-Corral ticket was announced before noon.

== Background ==
After the foundation of the First Mexican Republic, the offices of president and vice president were created, with the president being the winner of a national election and the vice president being the candidate who came in second. The first vice president, Nicolás Bravo, unsuccessfully attempted to oust the first president, Guadalupe Victoria, which set a precedent for conflicts between the president and vice president. The position of vice president was abolished and reintroduced twice, before an 1847 amendment to Mexico's constitution removed it for decades. The position was not restored with the adoption of the 1857 constitution.

Under the 1857 constitution, the president of the Supreme Court was to succeed the president. However, conflicts arose between President Benito Juárez and President of the Supreme Court Jesús González Ortega, and later between President Sebastián Lerdo de Tejada (Note: His surname is sometimes written simply as Lerdo. However, it is a single surname and should be written as Lerdo de Tejada. His full name was Sebastián Lerdo de Tejada y Corral, with his father being Juan Antonio Lerdo de Tejada y Matute and his mother being Concepción Corral y Bustillos.) and the president of the Supreme Court José María Iglesias. Under the advice of Justo Sierra, the Constitution was amended in 1882 to place the president of the senate first in the line of succession. In 1896, another amendment placed the Secretary of Foreign Affairs first in the line of succession, and if there was none, then it would be the secretary of the interior. It has been speculated that this was so then-president Porfirio Díaz could appease the presidential aspirations of his father-in-law, Manuel Romero Rubio, (Note: In this Spanish name, the first or paternal surname is Romero and the second or maternal family name is Rubio.) who was then the secretary of the Interior. However, he died in 1895, before the change was made. Being born in 1828, he had also been older than Díaz, who was born in 1830. Additionally, by 1904, the secretary of foreign affairs was Ignacio Mariscal, who was also older than Díaz. (Note: Although all three men were similar in age, Romero Rubio and Mariscal were still older than Díaz. Romero Rubio was born in 1828, Mariscal in 1829, and Díaz in 1830. Incidentally, Díaz outlived both of them as well. Romero Rubio died in office in 1895, and Mariscal died in office in 1910, while Díaz died in exile in 1915.)

After the triumph of the Liberal Party and the defeat of the Conservative Party in the Reform War and the Second French intervention, the Liberals split into three factions. One supported Juárez, one supported Lerdo de Tejada, and one supported Díaz. Díaz's ultimately prevailed. To support Díaz's 1892 reelection, a group of politicians, landowners, businessmen, and bankers formed the Unión Liberal (Spanish: Liberal Union), also known as Los Científicos (Spanish: The Scientists). Manuel Romero Rubio was the group's main founder. The Científicos were known for their adherence to positivism and connecting liberalism with promotion of Mexico's economic development and foreign investment. They consolidated Mexico's previously fractured political sectors together into a political elite, which allowed them to have a vital role in Díaz's government.

== Candidates ==
=== Presidential ===
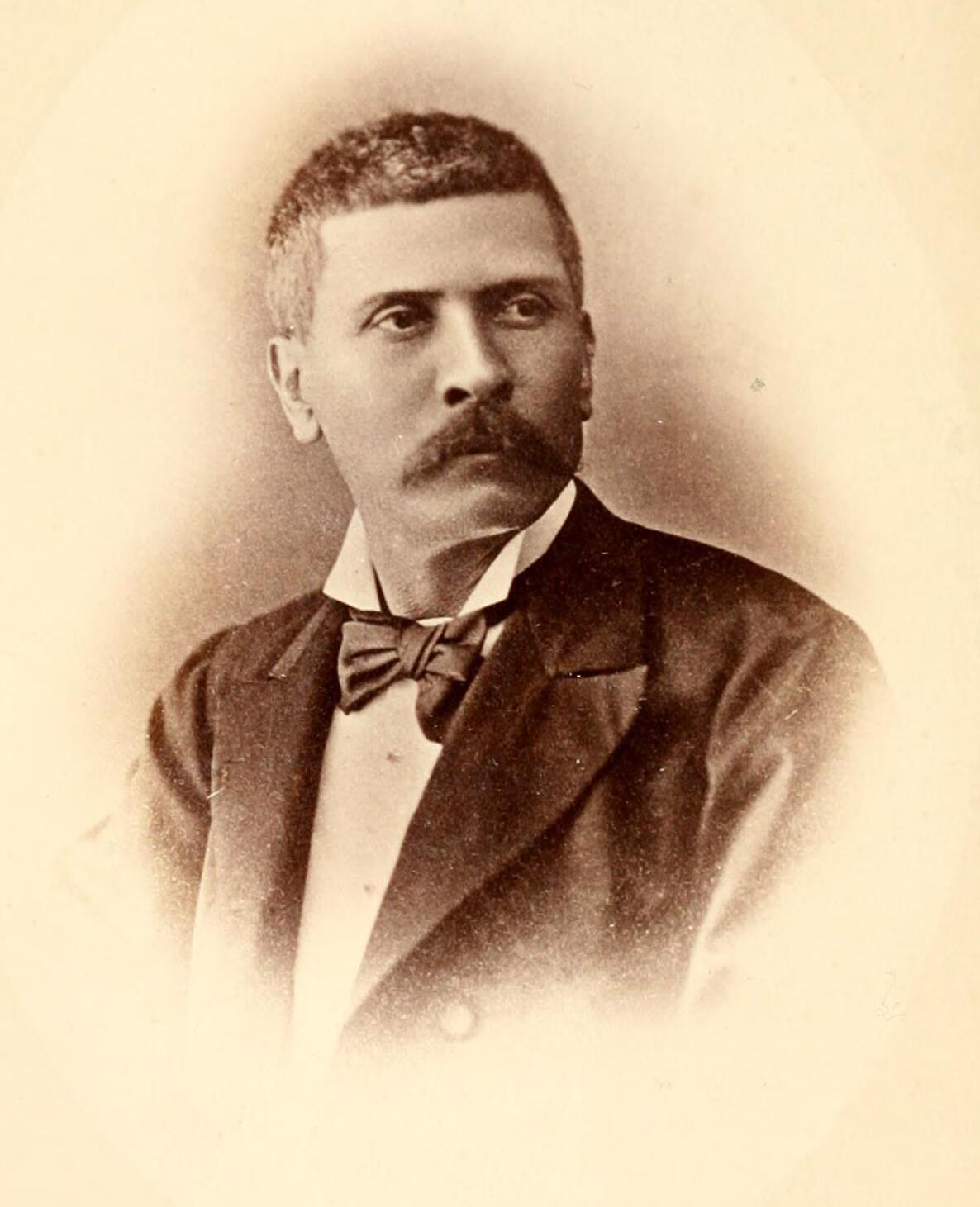
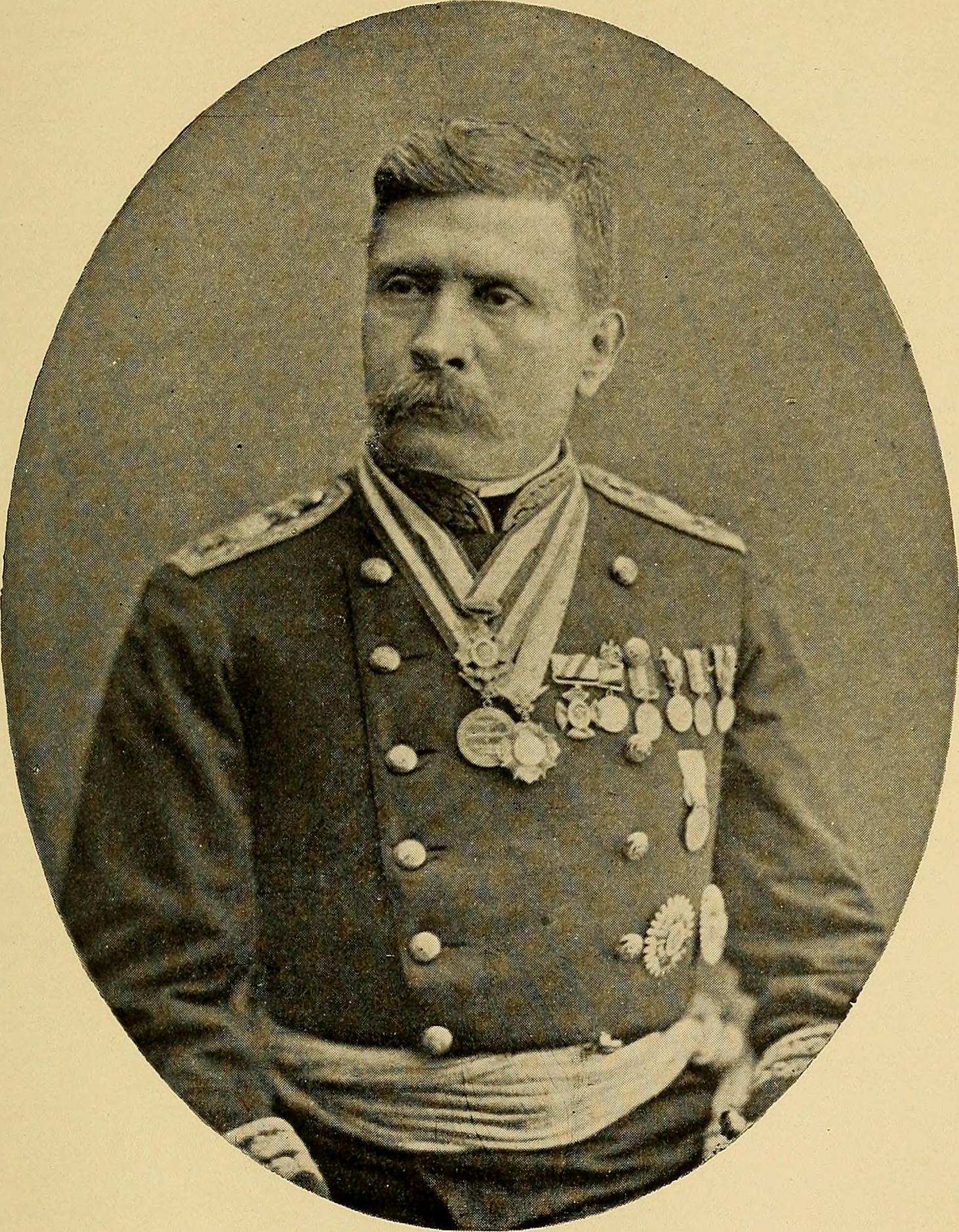
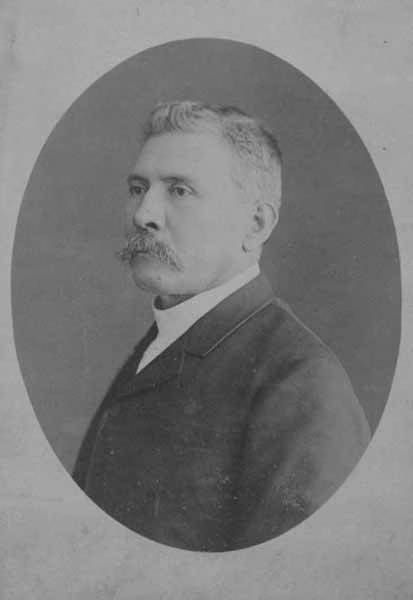
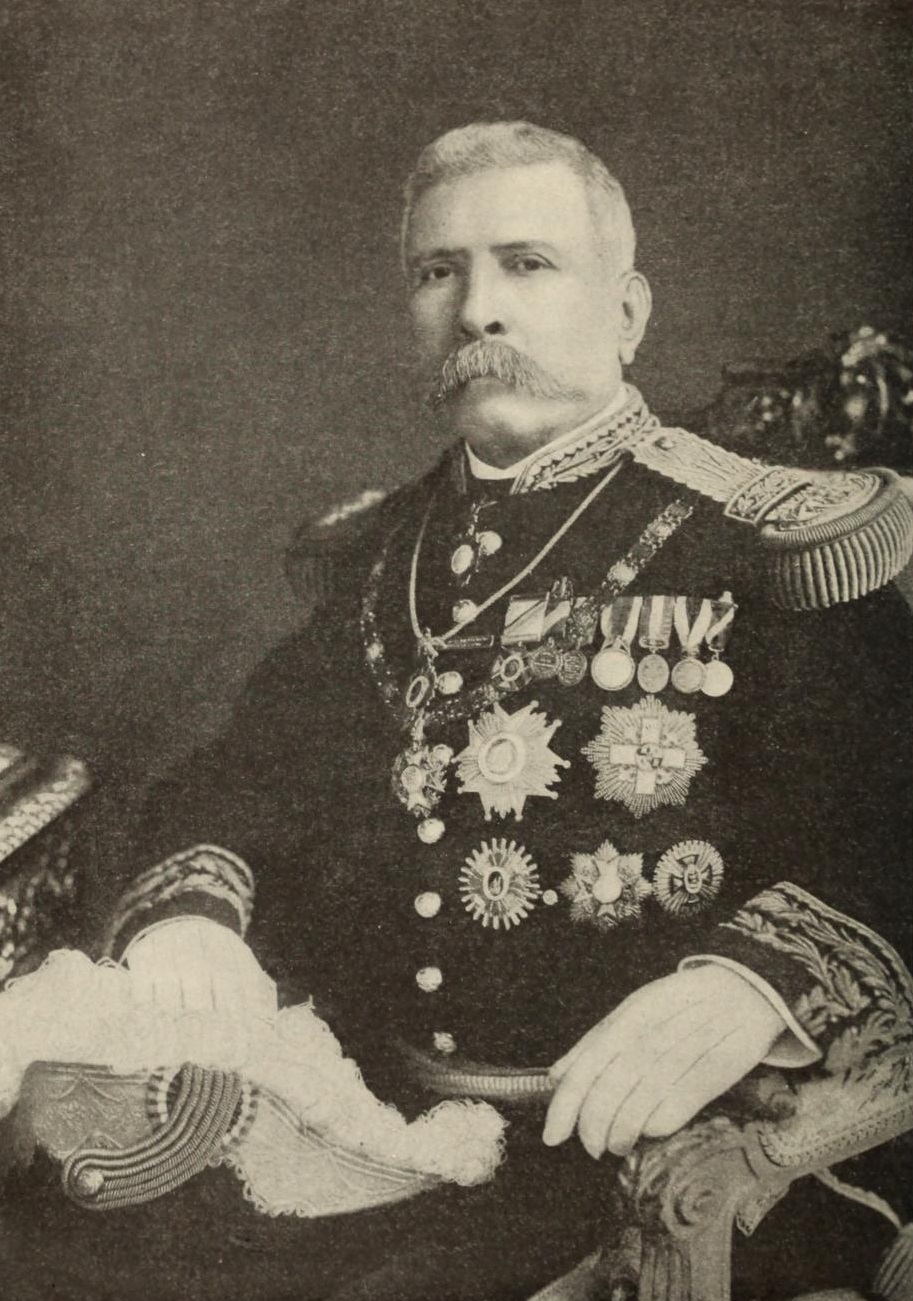
President Porfirio Díaz had been the incumbent since 1884. By 1904, his age was becoming a concern for his political allies. Left to right: Díaz c. 1880, in 1884, in 1895, and c. 1904.

José de la Cruz Porfirio Díaz Mori (Note: In this Spanish name, the first or paternal surname is Díaz and the second or maternal family name is Mori.) was born in Oaxaca City, Oaxaca in 1830. He came to prominence as a general fighting against the Conservative Party during the Reform War and against the French during the Second French intervention, which made him an ally of President Juárez. However, he revolted against Juárez following his reelection bid in 1871, but was defeated. In 1876, Díaz successfully ousted Juárez's successor, Lerdo de Tejada, who was seeking reelection, while Díaz positioned himself as anti-reelection. He served as president in 1876 and from 1877 to 1880 in an elected capacity. For the next four years, Díaz's ally Manuel González Flores held the presidency, however, in 1884, Díaz abandoned his pledge of no reelection, and won another term. An 1888 constitutional amendment allowed for him to be reelected that year, and a 1902 amendment made indefinite reelection legal. He was successfully re-elected every four years, holding the presidency up into 1904. This period is often known as the Porfiriato. Díaz's rule saw increased foreign investment and expansion of Mexico's railways. However, it was also marked by human rights violations and repressions against industrial workers, indigenous peoples, and peasant groups. Several analysts have since described Díaz as a dictator. (Note: Sources describing Díaz as a dictator include:)

Nicolás Zúñiga y Miranda (Note: In this Spanish name, the first or paternal surname is Zúñiga and the second or maternal family name is Miranda.) was an eccentric and perennial candidate for the presidency from Zacatecas, Zacatecas, who always ran as an independent, presenting himself as the "people's candidate". He first come to notoriety in Mexico City in 1887 due to his claim to have invented a seismograph, which happened to correctly predict an earthquake. This fame encouraged him to run as a candidate in the 1892 election against Díaz. According to Díaz's government, he only received 24 votes, but he claimed to have been the real winner, protested that elections were fraudulent, and was sentenced to 25 days in jail. He was popular with many citizens who convinced him to run again, but this support was ephemeral, and when he ran again in 1896 and 1900, recounts showed he received zero votes. Zúñiga y Miranda continued to claim fraud and declared himself the legitimate president.

=== Vice presidential ===
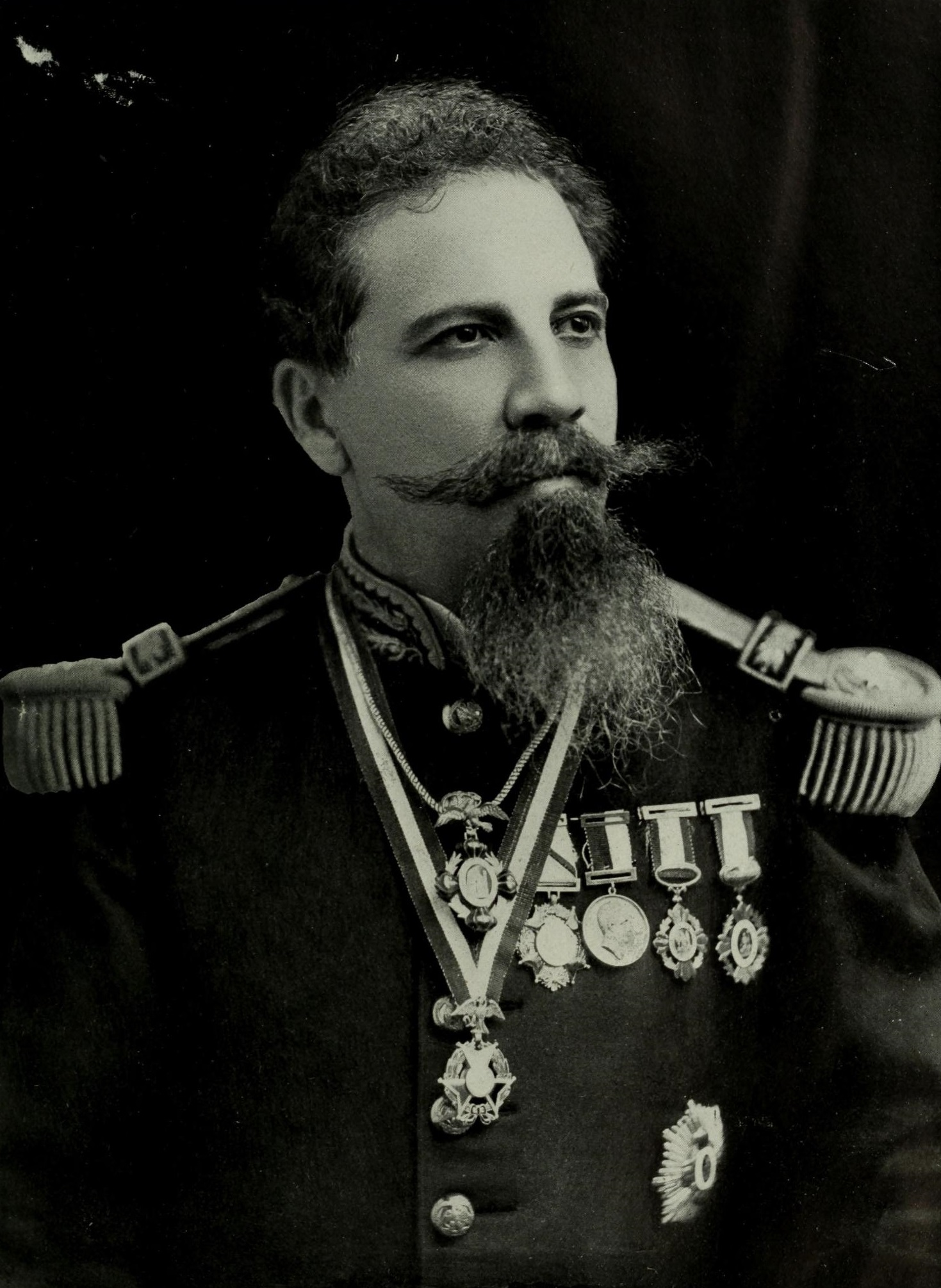
Bernardo Reyes (Secretary of War)

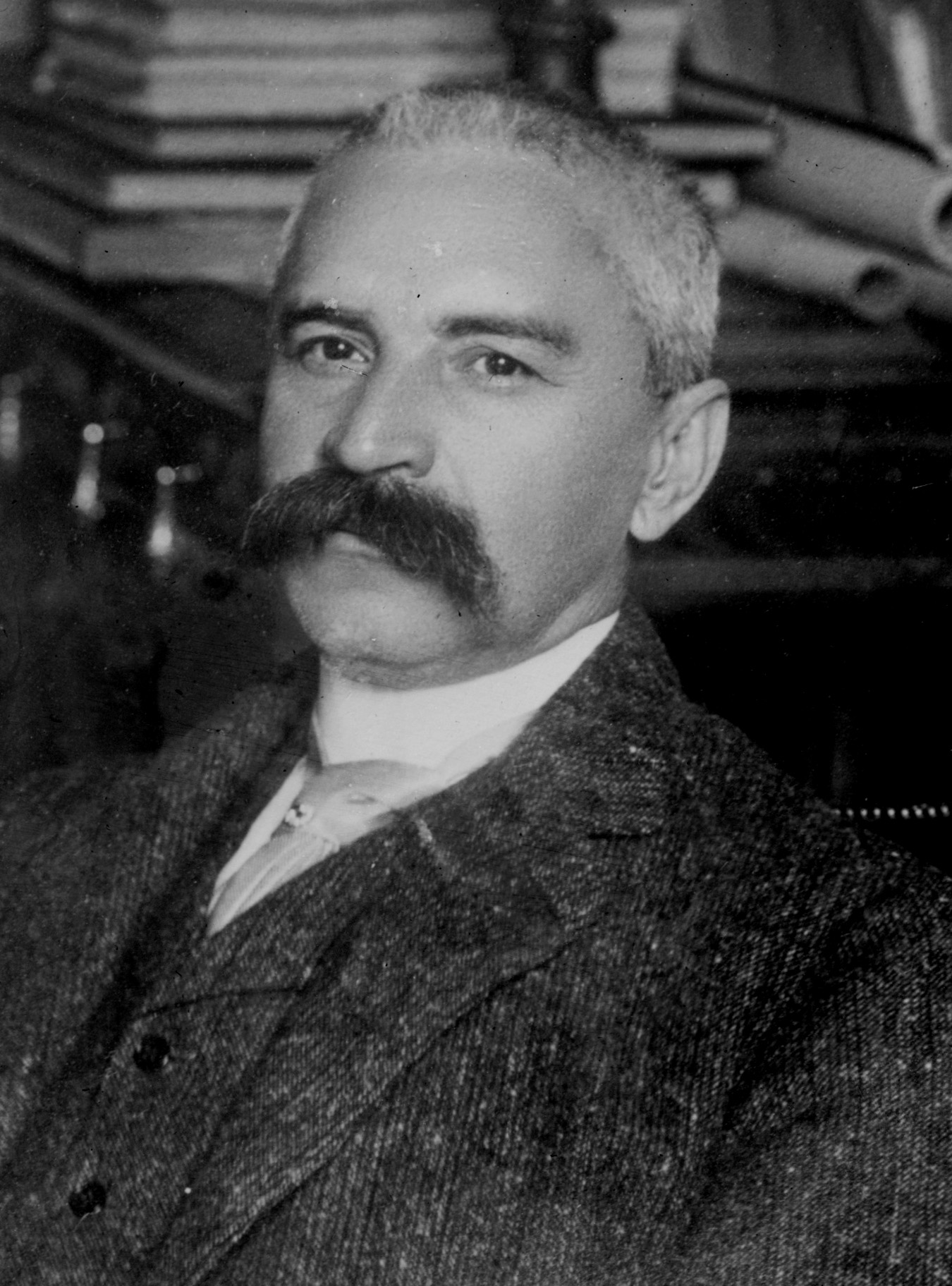
Ramón Corral (Secretary of the Interior)

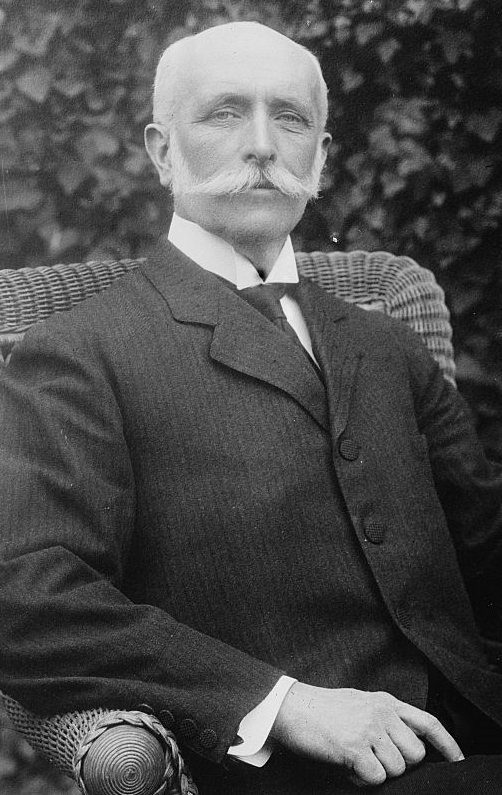
José Yves Limantour (Secretary of Finance)

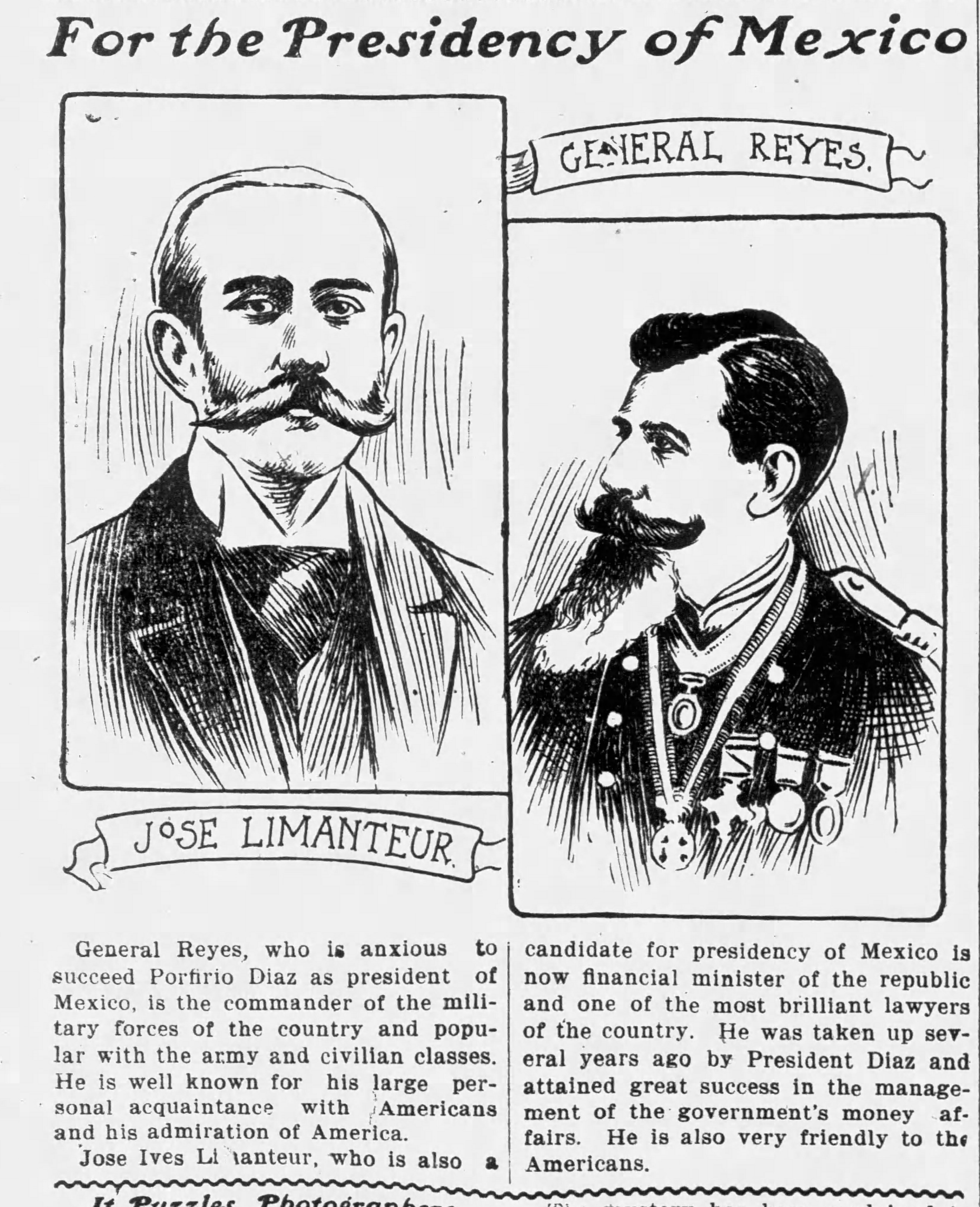
A 1901 article in the New York Republican on the presidential ambitions of Reyes and Limantour

Bernardo Reyes was born in 1850. A brigadier general, he was a supporter of President Díaz. During the 1880s he oversaw military operations in Northern Mexico against rebelling indigenous groups such as the Apache. He became the governor of Nuevo León, which was critical to Mexico's stability due to its proximity to the United States and its growing population. In this position he dismantled regional political machines and firmly placed the state under Díaz's control using brutality. However, he also oversaw economic growth, and improved foreign investment, infrastructure, labor conditions, education, sanitation, and public health. During his 1900 reelection, Díaz visited the governor and emphatically praised his leadership, which was rare for Díaz. Díaz appointed him Secretary of War. In that position he gave Mexico's army a strong public image. All this created the view of Reyes as a potential successor to Díaz.

Ramón Corral was born in Álamos, Sonora in 1854. He had been serving as Secretary of the Interior since 1903, and previously held various local posts, such as the governorship of his home state and governor of the federal district. Corral was a member of the Científicos. Díaz described Corral as a "president in reserve".

José Yves Limantour was born in 1854. Since 1893, he had been serving as Secretary of the Treasury in Díaz's cabinet. He was one of the founders of the Unión Liberal, and after Romero Rubio's death, Limantour was considered to be the unofficial leader of the Científicos. He was credited with introducing financial reforms that strengthened the Mexican peso and economy after several years of economic difficulties and debt. Notably, he oversaw the introduction of Mexico's private banking system, turned a budget deficit into a surplus, and in 1903 arranged to have the peso put on the gold standard. However, he had also failed to make credit widely available, and he failed to secure a large amount of funding for the federal government itself.

== Campaign ==
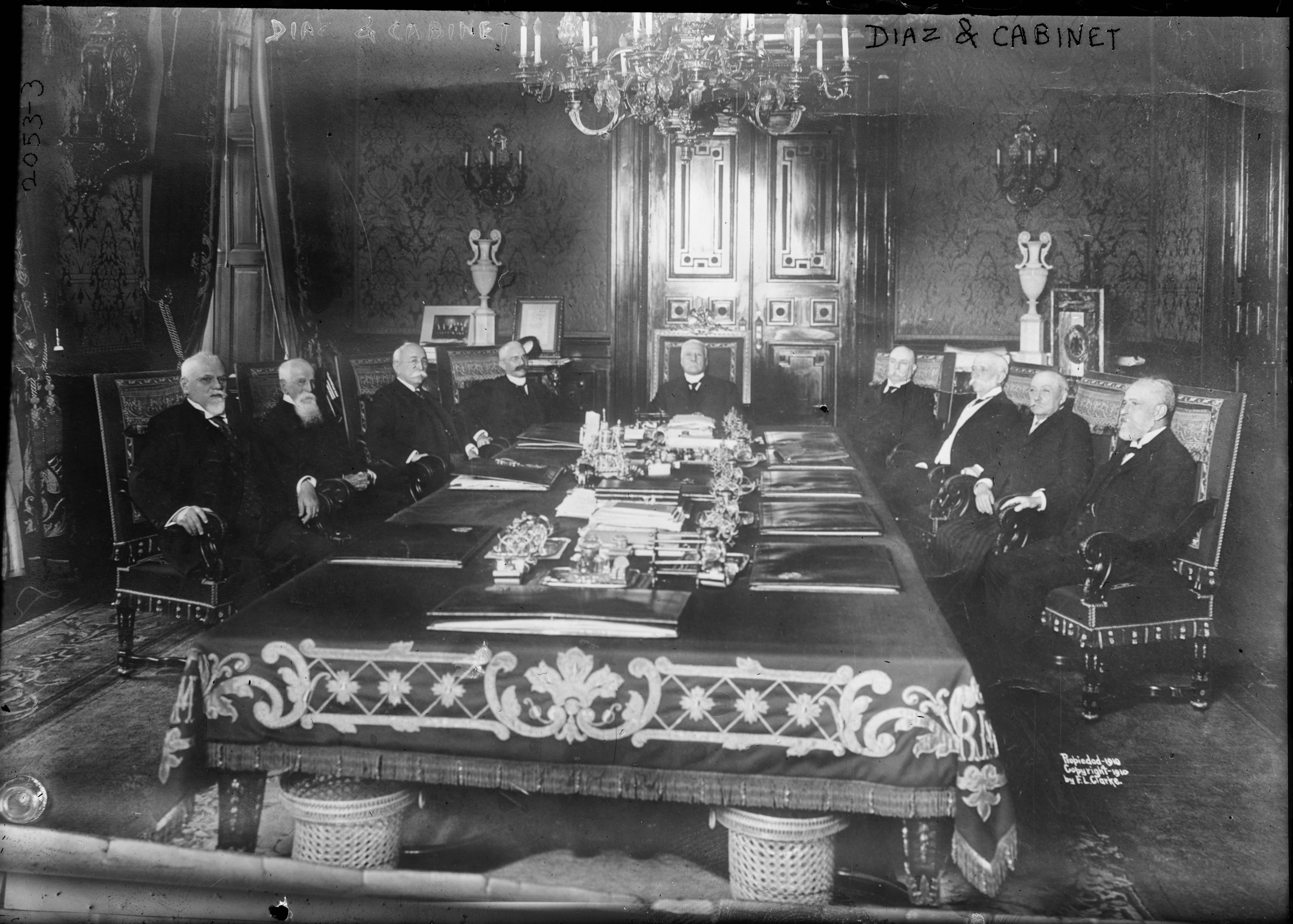
Díaz (center) and the Científicos. Corral is the fourth from the left and Limantour the third from the right.

In 1903, preparations began for Díaz's reelection the following year. At that point, Díaz was 73 years old. The Científicos insisted that Díaz reestablish the position of vice president so that there would be a clear successor should Díaz die in office. This was also advocated by representatives of foreign investors, who specified that the vice president must be someone younger than Díaz. Congress then amended the constitution to reestablish the vice presidency and to extend the next term from four years to six.

On May 20, 1904, a large convention occurred to renominate Díaz and select a vice presidential candidate. Limantour and Reyes were viewed as strong potential vice presidential contenders. Earlier, Reyes had been ordered to resign from his cabinet position, possibly in a ploy by Díaz to establish Limantour as his successor instead. However, by 1904, he appeared to be backing away from that idea as well. Limantour as offered the position as Díaz's running mate, but he publicly turned it down. Ultimately, Corral was announced as the running mate and Díaz was renominated. (Note: Reyes, Limantour, and Corral were all younger than Díaz, as was required. Reyes was born in 1850, and Corral and Limantour were born in 1854. Despite this, out of all of Díaz's potential successors, only Limantour outlived Díaz. Corral died in 1912, and Reyes died in 1913. Limantour outlived Díaz by 20 years, dying in 1935.) The selection of Corral was reportedly unpopular.

During the election, as he had done previously, Díaz never acknowledged any opposition candidates.

== Results ==
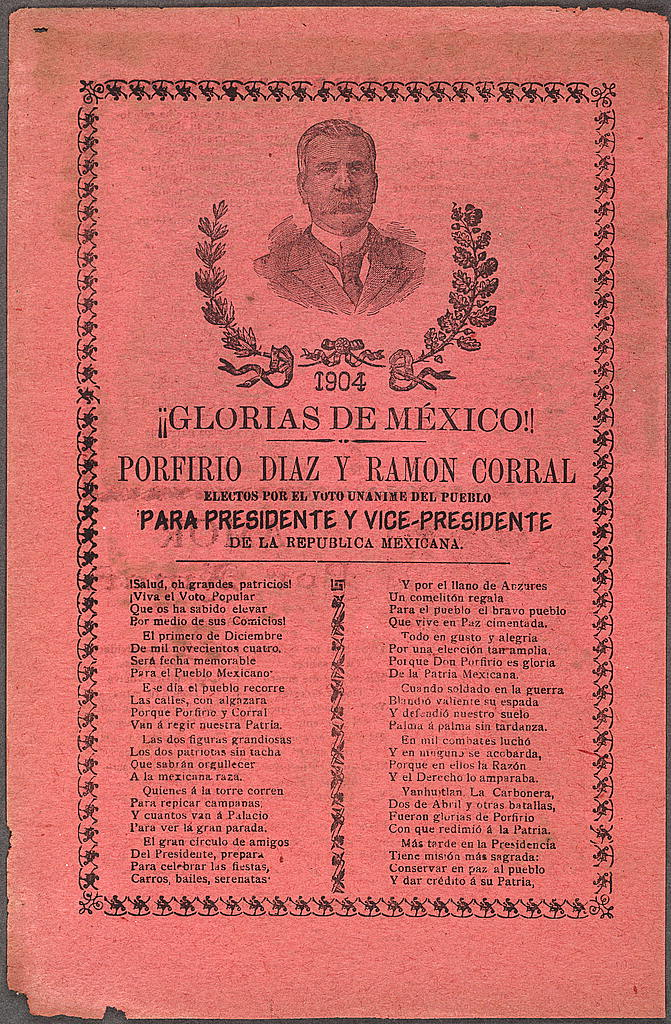
1904 pamphlet celebrating the electoral victory of Díaz and Corral

The election took place on July 11, 1904. It occurred so quickly that at 10:15, the ringing of temple bells in Mexico City announced that the Díaz-Corral ticket won unanimously.

=== President ===
Candidate	Votes	%
Porfirio Díaz	19,008	100.00
Nicolás Zúñiga y Miranda	0	0.00
Total	19,008	100.00
Source: Ramírez Rancaño, López

=== Vice-president ===
Candidate	Votes	%
Ramón Corral	18,998	99.91
Other candidates	17	0.09
Total	19,015	100.00
Source: Aguilar Rivera

== Aftermath ==
Corral was inaugurated on December 1 of that year as vice president. He was Mexico's first vice president in decades, and the first to have been elected by a popular vote. At the time, some international observers believed Díaz was preparing Corral to succeed him as president, and speculated that Díaz would not run for president again in 1910 due to his age. In January 1905, Díaz took a month-long vacation to Tehuantepec, and during that time he left Corral in charge of the federal government until he returned, the first time a president had done so. Aside from this, Díaz gave Corral very little to do in the position. Corral mainly attended ceremonies he had little interest in, although he continued to serve as secretary of the interior, which kept him occupied with actual work.

The selection of Corral, a close confidant of Díaz, as vice president signified that even if the president died, the same clique would continue to govern Mexico. Corral's unpopularity lead Díaz to send Reyes to assignments in Europe, as Reyes was viewed as becoming too popular.
