= Sexenio =

Sexenio is the Spanish term for a period of six years. It may also refer to:

- Sexenio (Mexico), the six-year term limit on the Mexican presidency and state governments
- Sexenio (Bolivia) (1946–1952), the six-year period in the history of Bolivia that preceded the 1952 Revolution
- Sexenio Democrático (Spain) (1868–1874), the period from the overthrow of Queen Isabella II to the Bourbon Restoration in Spain

== See also ==
- Sexenio de Morella, a festival held in Morella, Castellón, Spain
