= Sexenio (Mexico) =

Term limit on the President of Mexico

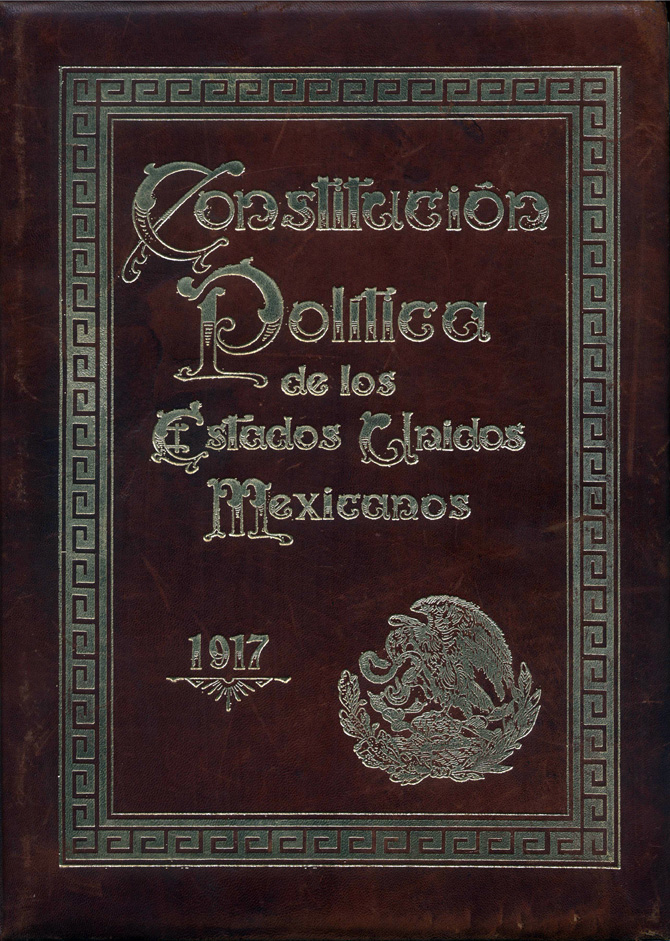
Since 1928, an amendment to the Mexican Constitution of 1917 has provided for a single six-year term for presidents.

Sexenio is the popular term for the term of office on the President of Mexico. Under article 83 of the Mexican Constitution, the president is limited to a single six-year term, and no one who holds the office, even on a caretaker basis, is permitted to run for or hold the office ever again. It is one of the country's most important political institutions, because it is one of the few significant limitations on executive power in Mexico, which is strong at local, state, and national levels. The sexenio was a reaction to failed re-election experiences occurring during Mexico's first fifty years as an independent country and, most notably, the Porfiriato era (1876–1911).

Originally known as the "sexenal plan" (Plan Sexenal), the main goal of the sexenio was to provide a clear path to follow for governmental actions during a president's term of office, with the intention to fulfill the unsatisfied social and economic demands—mainly those related to agricultural, industrial and urban development and to the improvement of precarious working conditions—which were major root causes of the 1910 revolution.

In addition to the presidency, state governors also face this restriction; no one elected as a governor may ever hold the post again, even on an interim or substitute basis.

== History ==
On 4 October 1824, Mexico became a republic with the promulgation of its first federal constitution, which, in its article 74, created the office of president of the United Mexican States. Article 95 established a four-year term of office for the president, while article 77 forbade reelection for the immediately following term. However, the Constitution had no explicit limitation on the total number of terms an individual could serve as president. The first president of Mexico under this Constitution was Guadalupe Victoria who, incidentally, was the only one to serve a full term in almost 30 years of independent Mexico.

On 30 December 1836, the conservatives enacted the Siete Leyes (lit. 'seven laws') to replace the federalist Constitution of 1824 and establish a unitary state known as the Centralist Republic of Mexico. Article 1 of the fourth law of this new centralist Constitution laid out that the executive would be led by the President of the Republic (Presidente de la República), who will remain in office for eight years, with article 5 allowing the possibility of their immediate reelection. This Constitution also did not have an explicit limitation on the number of terms that an individual could be reelected president. The first president elected under the 1836 Constitution was Anastasio Bustamante, taking office on 19 April 1837. Bustamante had also served as the 4th president (1 January 1830–13 August 1832) under the 1824 Constitution when he, as vice president, had ascended to the presidency after the conservatives' coup d'état against Vicente Guerrero.

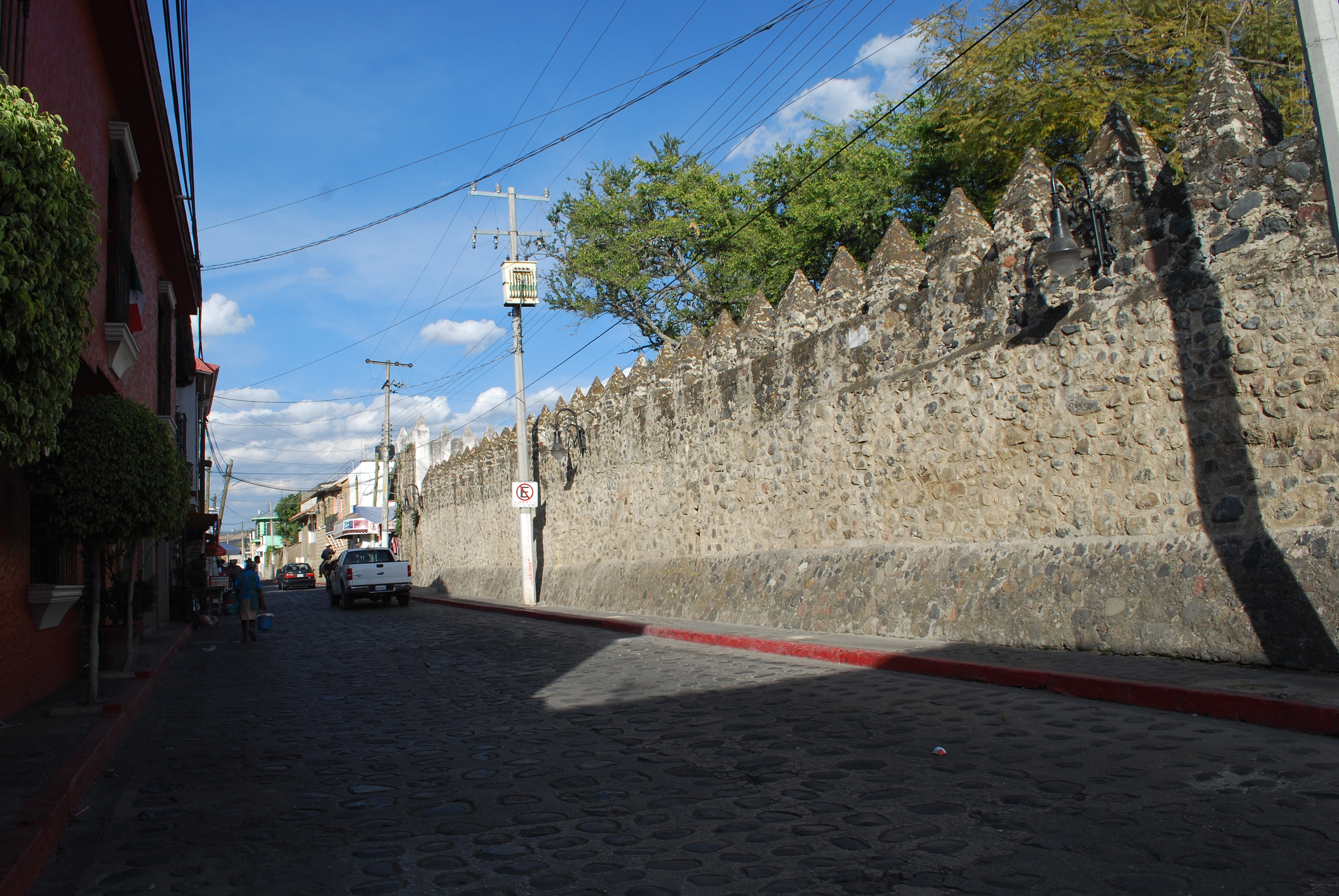
Mexico's ban on re-elections was considered so integral to good governance that several streets are named after the principle: pictured is the Calle No Reelección in Yecapixtla, Morelos

After dictator Antonio López de Santa Anna was deposed in the Revolution of Ayutla, a series of laws known as La Reforma were introduced, including a new 1857 Constitution (based on the earlier 1824 constitution) which limited the president to a single four-year term. General Porfirio Díaz seized power in the Plan of Tuxtepec, got the ban on reelection repealed, and ended up winning eight elections, between 1877 and 1904, before he was deposed in 1911. This period, called the Porfiriato (1876–1911), soured public interest in reelection, and the ban was reintroduced not long after.

When the Mexican Constitution of 1917 was introduced, the president was limited to a single four-year term. During the presidency of Plutarco Elías Calles, the term of office was extended to six years, beginning with the 1928-1934 term. Former president Álvaro Obregón launched a successful campaign to alter the Constitution to only ban consecutive terms. He ran in the 1928 election and won, but was assassinated before he could take office again, and an out-of-cycle 1929 election was held to pick someone to serve the remainder of the term. The total ban on presidential reelection was reinstated in 1933, alongside a new ban on reelection in Congress the year after that. Campaigns to end the reelection ban were launched in 1964 and 1991, both times unsuccessfully.

== Success ==
The PRI held the presidency for 71 years, with outgoing presidents essentially choosing their own successors.

The sexenio has not entirely met its goal of preventing a presidential dictatorship. This is in part because from 1929 to 2000, when that year's election was won by PAN candidate Vicente Fox, the presidency was monopolized by the Institutional Revolutionary Party (PRI). From 1929 to 1994, the PRI's nominee was selected by presidents approaching the end of their sexenio; with the party's dominance so absolute, it was as if a successor was being appointed. There is strong evidence that the three presidents who followed Plutarco Elías Calles were all controlled by him behind the scenes, such that the six-year period from 1 December 1928 to 1 December 1934 is commonly called the Maximato, after his sobriquet jefe máximo (Maximum Leader).

The ban on presidential reelection is so entrenched in Mexican politics, even when Article 59 of the Constitution was amended to allow legislators to run for multiple consecutive terms, the president remained barred from the same. It is also referenced by street names in Mexican cities, such as Calle No Reelección (lit. 'No Re-election street') in Puerto Peñasco.

== Changes ==
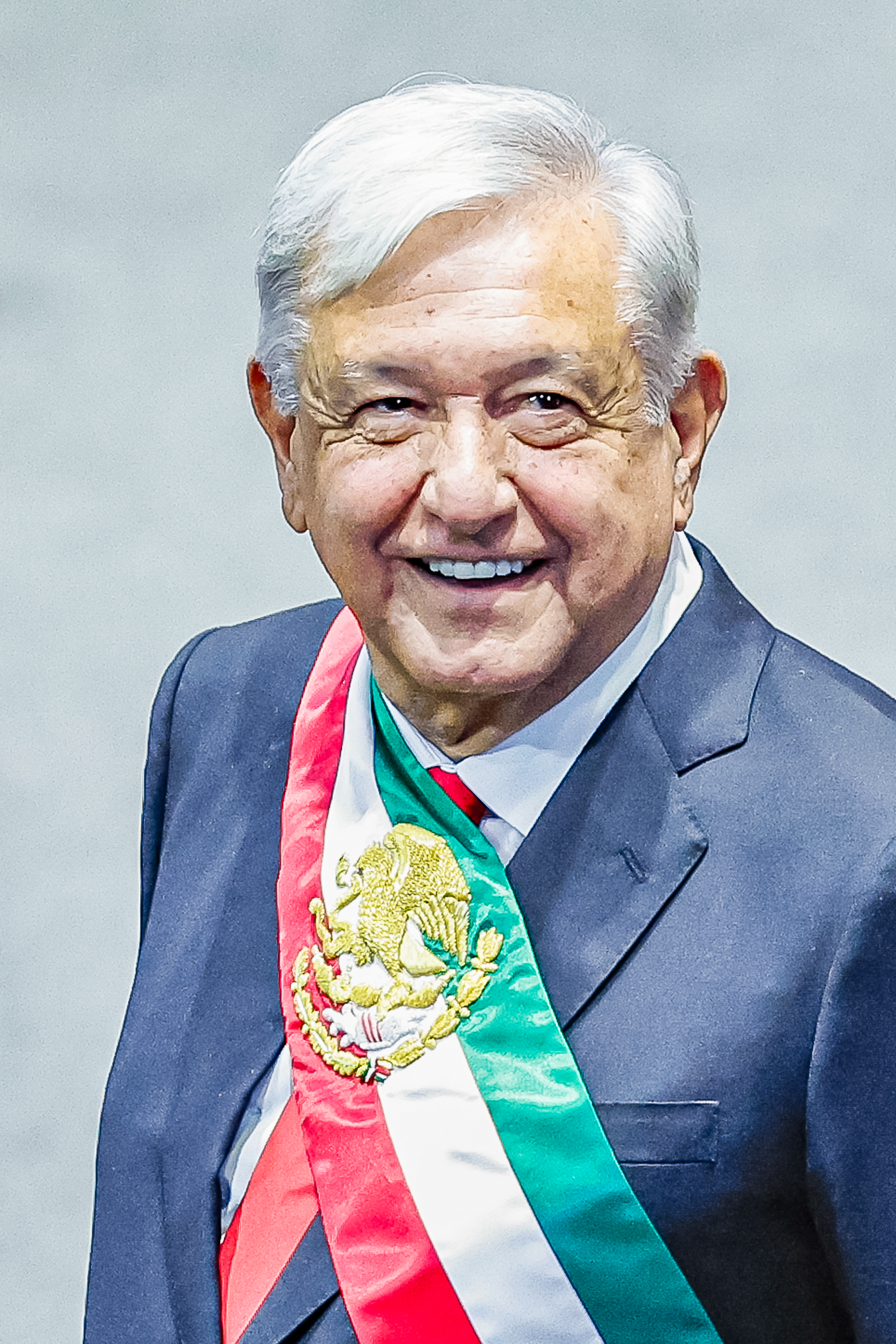
Andrés Manuel López Obrador has been the only president since 1934 without a full six-year sexenio.

Under the original 1917 Constitution, the inauguration of a new president took place on 1 December of the same year as the general federal election, marking the start of a new sexenio. However, in 2014, article 83 of the Constitution was amended to move the inauguration date forward to 1 October, starting with the 2024–2030 term. President Andrés Manuel López Obrador's term in office was thus reduced by two months, becoming the only sexenio to last less than six years (5 years and 10 months). The reform was a three month reduction in the length of the transition period, i.e., the time between the election of new presidents and their inauguration, which allows more time for an incoming administration to prepare the federal budget, which must be sent to Congress by 15 November.

Prior to this amendment, and as 31 December is the deadline for Congress to approve the yearly economic package, incoming administrations had limited influence on the federal budget and had to rely heavily on data and forecasts provided by the outgoing administration. This situation was evidenced during the first weeks of president Ernesto Zedillo's administration, when his predecessor, Carlos Salinas de Gortari, was accused of manipulating economic data to maintain an image of prosperity and economic stability during the last months of his administration, resulting in a major monetary crisis that had negative impacts throughout Zedillo's presidency.

== See also ==
- Quinquennat, renewable five-year term of the president of France
- La ley de Herodes
- Term limit
- Term of office
