= Teodoro A. Dehesa Méndez =

Mexican politician (1848–1936)

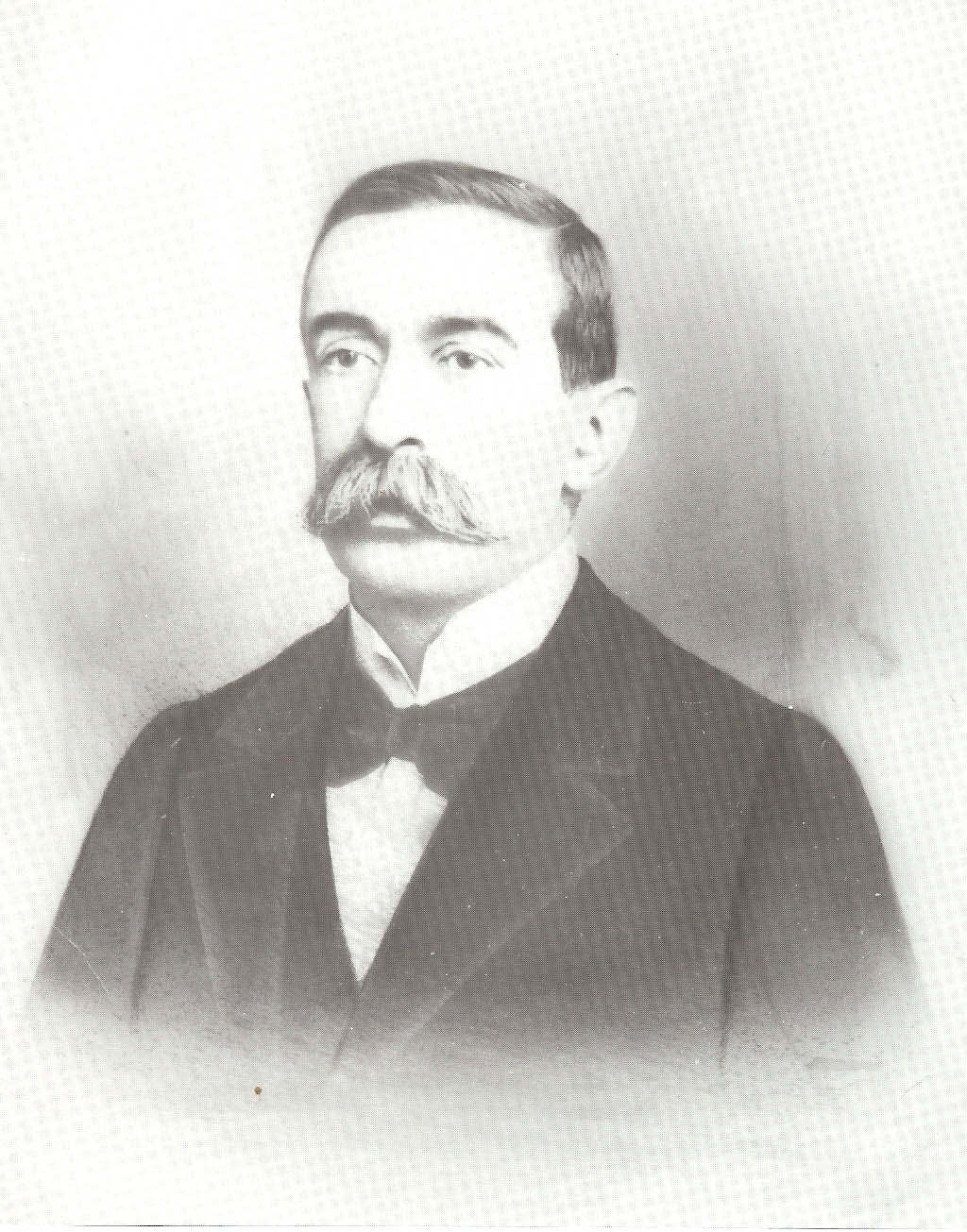

24th Governor of Veracruz
- In office December 1, 1892 – November 30, 1896
- Preceded by: Leandro M. Alcolea Sierra

25th Governor of Veracruz
- In office December 1, 1896 – November 30, 1900

26th Governor of Veracruz
- In office December 1, 1900 – November 30, 1904

27th Governor of Veracruz
- In office December 1, 1904 – November 30, 1908

28th Governor of Veracruz
- In office December 1, 1908 – May 1911
- Succeeded by: Emilio Léycegui

Personal details
- Born: October 1, 1848 Veracruz, Veracruz
- Died: September 25, 1936 (aged 87) Veracruz, Veracruz

Teodoro A. Dehesa Méndez (October 1, 1848 – September 25, 1936) was the Governor of the state of Veracruz in Mexico for five terms from 1892 to 1911.

== Early years ==
Teodoro Dehesa was the son of Teodoro Dehesa y Bayona, an Aragonese pastry chef, and Antonia Méndez y Ruiz de Olivares, member of a wealthy family of Xalapa, Veracruz.

He studied his first letters at La Amiga, under supervision of Jacinta, Dolores and Carmen Torres. Later he studied at the Juan Rodríguez College. After his family moved to Xalapa, he finished his primary education at Francisco Ramos school and then joined Teodoro Kerlegand's Liceum.

== Assisting of Diego Rivera ==
When the artist Diego Rivera was looking for a sponsor to allow him to travel to Europe to further his art career, he approached Dehesa, who agreed to sponsor him. A chapter in Diego Rivera's autobiography, My Art, My Life, was dedicated to Dehesa and details how the opposition forces respected Dehesa and so refused to attack the city in which he was staying. Diego Rivera also mentioned his great respect for Dehesa.

== Mexican Revolution ==
As a result of the Mexican Revolution of 1910, Teodoro Dehesa, his son, and Teodoro's brother, Francisco, were forced to flee Mexico. Teodoro Dehesa moved to Cuba and, at some point, returned to Mexico, where he later died in 1936.

== Legacy ==
Descendants of Teodoro Dehesa still live in Mexico. It is unknown what happened to Francisco Dehesa, but his wife and children moved to California, where their descendants still live.

Preceded by Leandro M. Alcolea Sierra	Governor of Veracruz; 1892 - 1911	Succeeded by Emilio Léycegui
