= José Yves Limantour =

Mexican financier/politician (1854–1935)

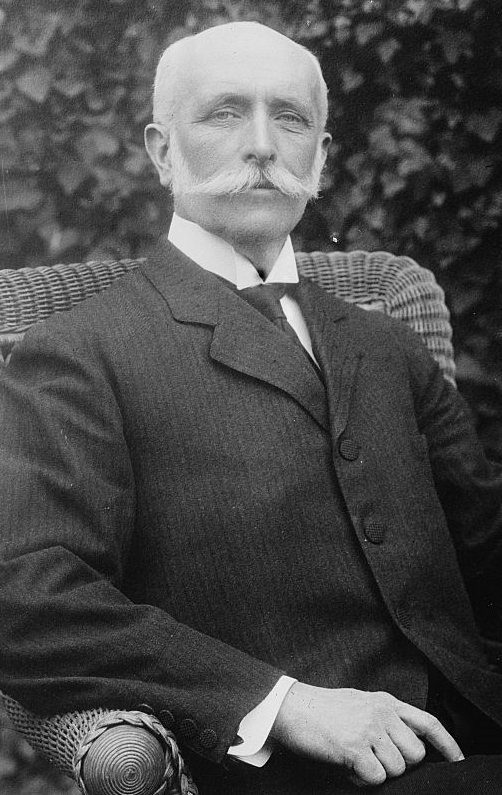
- José Yves Limantour in 1910

Mexican Secretary of Finance
- In office 8 May 1893 – 25 May 1911
- President: Porfirio Díaz
- Preceded by: Matías Romero
- Succeeded by: Ernesto Madero

Personal details
- Born: José Yves Limantour Marquet; 26 December 1854 Mexico City
- Died: 26 August 1935 (aged 80) Paris, French Third Republic
- Resting place: Montmartre Cemetery
- Spouse: María Cañas y Buch (m. 1880)
- Parent(s): Joseph Yves Limantour and Adela Marquet

José Yves Limantour Marquet (Spanish pronunciation: [xo'se ˈiβ(e)s limanˈtuɾ]; 26 December 1854 – 26 August 1935) was a Mexican financier and politician who served as Secretary of the Finance of Mexico from 1893 until the fall of the Porfirio Díaz regime in 1911. One of the most prominent politicians of the Porfiriato era, he was a key member of Díaz's technocratic advisors known as Los Científicos.

Born into a French Mexican family in Mexico City, Limantour received a high education. He studied economics, and after a period working as a legal teacher, he was appointed as Mexico's secretary of finance in 1893. As the secretary of finance, Limantour established the gold standard in Mexico, suspending free coinage of silver, and mandating only government coins be used. He secured the national debt in 1899 with a consortium of foreign banks, and at the time of the outbreak of the Revolution, Mexico was on strong financial basis.

Before the Mexican Revolution he was widely seen, along with General Bernardo Reyes, as one of the stronger candidates to succeed President Díaz. After the revolution broke out due to unpopularity of the Díaz regime, he went into exile in France, where he died in 1935.

== Early life ==
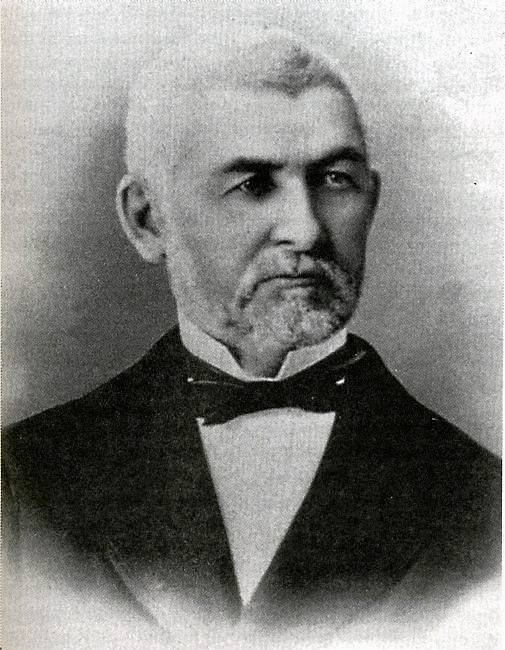
Limantour's father Joseph Yves Limantour

José Limantour was born on 26 December 1854 in Mexico City, Mexico. His parents were Joseph Yves Limantour, a ship captain from Brittany, France, and Adela Marquet, born in Bourdeaux. The Limantour family grew wealthy through land speculation in Baja California and Mexico City when the Liberals seized church property, redistributing land. After private primary schooling in Mexico, Limantour went to Europe at 14. On his return from that journey he attended the National Preparatory School. He received a law degree with specialized studies in economics and management. At the inception of Porfiriato, he was teaching at the School of Commerce and the National School of Jurisprudence. He also wrote for the legal journal El Foro (The Forum) from 1877 to 1882.

== Secretary of Finance ==
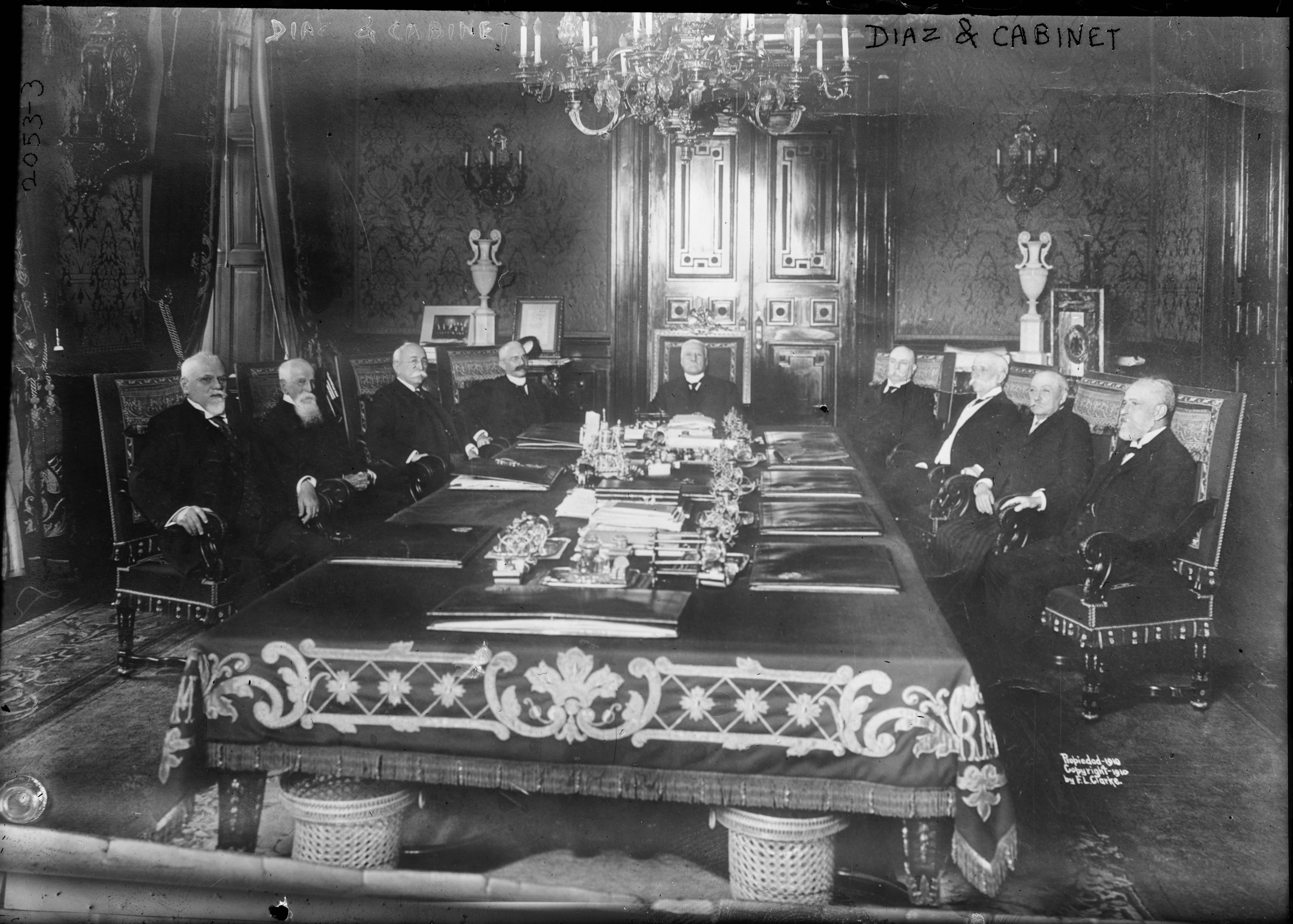
Limantour with President Porfirio Díaz and Los Científicos

After the death of Matías Romero Rubio in 1895, Limantour was considered the political leader of the technocratic advisers to President Díaz known as científicos ("the scientists"), who were highly educated and wanted expanded intellectualism and prosperity in Mexico. They supported the Díaz regime because of its efforts to modernize the country, yet they also wanted expanded freedom.

As Secretary of Finance, he expanded foreign investment into Mexico, supported free trade, and balanced the budget for the first time and generated a budget surplus by 1894. However, even with the economic prosperity of Mexican business, the common people of the country suffered because of the rising cost of food.

Towards the end of the Díaz regime, the president felt that Limantour was becoming too powerful, and thus he sent him to Europe to negotiate loans. Then, with the pending military collapse of the Díaz regime, he returned to Mexico and encouraged Díaz to resign. He negotiated Díaz's 1911 exit from Mexico into exile in Paris.

== Exile and death ==
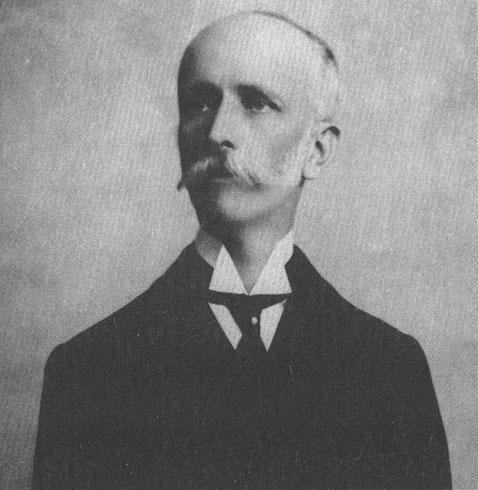
Limantour in 1909

A week after Díaz set off to Europe, Limantour left for New York City by train. He arrived to Paris in July 1911, while the former dictator was resting in a seaside resort at Deauville. They exchanged letters, but they rarely met during their first months living in Paris, as Díaz resented reports that Limantour had attempted to negotiate his eventual reincorporation in the federal cabinet with the revolutionary leader, Francisco I. Madero.

Limantour had strong ties with the Madero family, as he had served as their trade agent in Mexico City. In the end, however, Madero chose his uncle Ernesto, an experienced banker from Coahuila, as his secretary of Finance and Díaz and Limantour were eventually reconciled.

Limantour remained in France for the remainder of his life. He became a member of the Académie des sciences morales et politiques and was named a grand officer of the French Legion of Honor. He died in Paris on August 26, 1935, largely forgotten.

== Bibliography ==
- Apuntes sobre mi vida pública (Porrúa, 1965).

== Sources ==
- Aston, B. W., "The Public Career of Don José Ives Limantour." Ph.D. dissertation, Texas Tech University 1972.
- Crosman, Herbert A. "The Early Career of José Ives Limantour, 1854-1886." Ph.D. dissertation. Harvard University 1949.
- Díaz Dufoo, Carlos. Limantour. Mexico: Edusebio Gómez de la Puente 1910.
- Schmidt, Arthur. "José Ives Limantour" in Encyclopedia of Mexico, vol. 1, pp. 746–749. Chicago: Fitzroy and Dearborn 1997.
