= Bernardo Reyes =

Mexican general and politician (1850-1913)

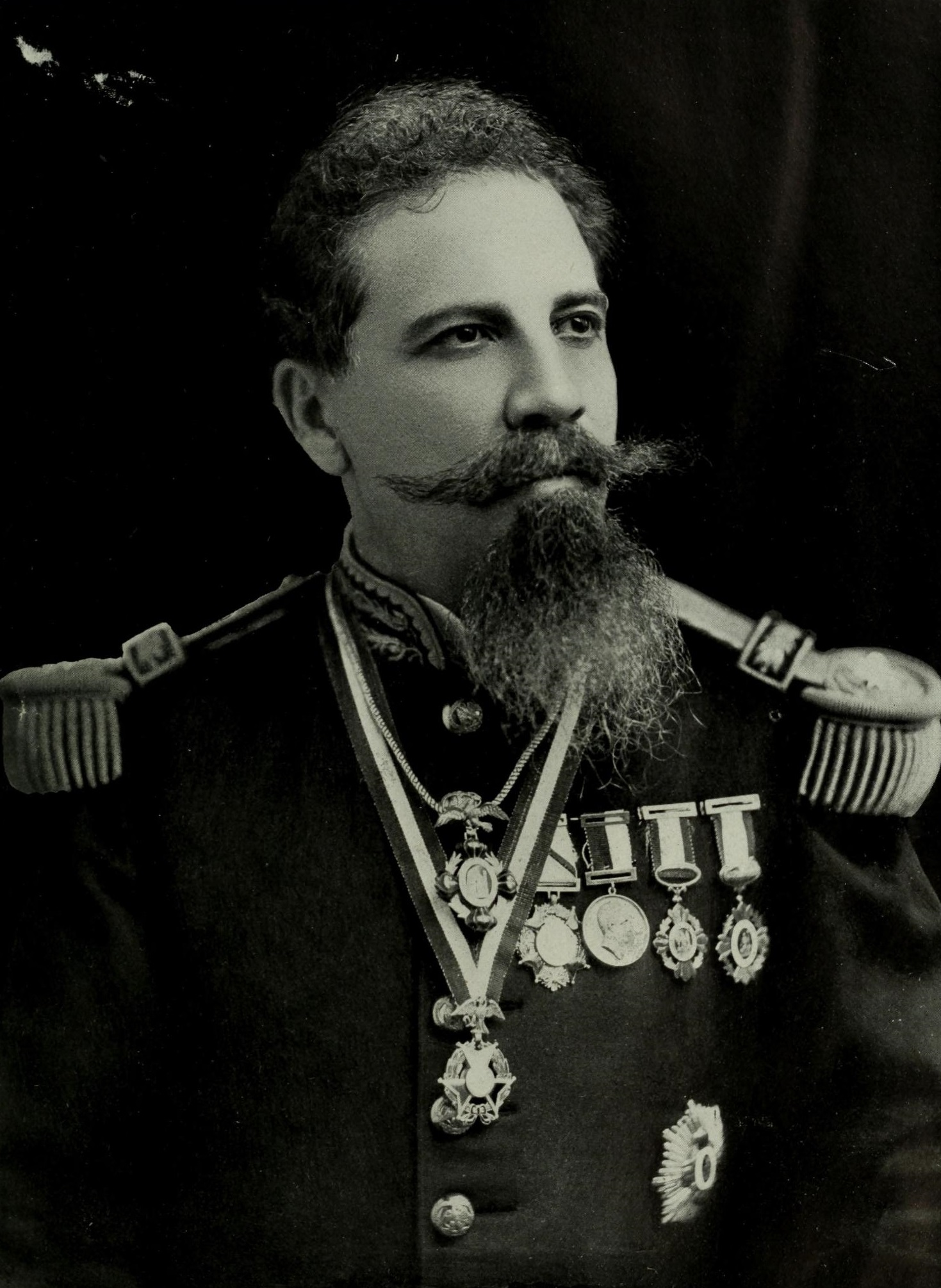
- Portrait of Bernardo Reyes c. 1901

Governor of Nuevo León
- In office 29 December 1902 – 24 October 1909
- Preceded by: Pedro Benítez Leal
- Succeeded by: José María Mier
- In office 19 December 1897 – 23 January 1900
- Preceded by: Carlos Félix Ayala
- Succeeded by: Pedro Benítez Leal
- In office 23 May 1896 – 3 December 1897
- Preceded by: Carlos Berardi
- Succeeded by: Carlos Félix Ayala
- In office 4 October 1889 – 21 April 1896
- Preceded by: Lázaro Garza Ayala
- Succeeded by: Carlos Berardi
- In office 12 December 1885 – 4 October 1887
- Preceded by: Mauro A. Sepúlveda
- Succeeded by: Lázaro Garza Ayala

Secretary of War and Navy
- In office 25 January 1900 – 24 December 1902
- President: Porfirio Díaz
- Preceded by: Felipe Berriozábal
- Succeeded by: Francisco Zacarías Mena

Personal details
- Born: 30 August 1850 Guadalajara, Mexico
- Died: February 9, 1913 (aged 62) Mexico City, Mexico
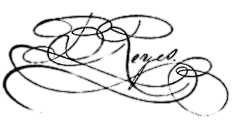
- Signature

Military service
- Branch/service: Mexican Army
- Years of service: 1865–1913
- Rank: General
- Battles/wars: Second French intervention in Mexico; Siege of Queretaro; Mexican Revolution; Ten Tragic Days †

Bernardo Doroteo Reyes Ogazón (30 August 1850 – 9 February 1913) was a Mexican general and politician who fought in the Second French intervention in Mexico and served as the appointed Governor of Nuevo León for more than two decades during the Porfiriato. During Reyes's administration as Governor, the state made important economic, industrial and social advances, and he was one of the closest and most faithful allies of President of Mexico Porfirio Díaz. He was killed during a failed coup d'état (known as the Ten Tragic Days) against President Francisco I. Madero in the first stage of the Mexican Revolution.

Born in a prominent liberal family in the western state of Jalisco, he served in the army, rising to the rank of general. Like his political patron, General Porfirio Díaz, Reyes was a military man who became an able administrator. He helped in the modernization of that state, enabling local industrialization, improving public education and health, and supporting improvements in the lives of workers. While governor of Nuevo León, Reyes approved a workers compensation law.

In 1900, Díaz named Reyes the Secretary of War and Navy. He expanded the military, establishing the Second Reserve, a citizens' militia group. While the Second Reserve was eventually disbanded, it was a key component of Reyes' political strategy. However, he resigned from office after two years amid political conflict with the Cientificos, a circle of technocratic advisors to Diaz who saw the Second Reserve as a private army loyal to Reyes. Reyes then returned to Nuevo León, where his popularity grew, and he was considered a likely successor to Díaz. Reyista clubs supporting him for the presidency were formed, but he declined to challenge Díaz in the election of 1910.

After being forced from office in 1909, he embarked on a European tour and did not return until after Diaz was deposed in 1910 by Francisco I. Madero.

== Early life and family ==
Bernardo Doroteo Reyes Ogazón was born on August 20, 1849, at 121 López Cotilla Street in Guadalajara, Jalisco to a prominent military and political family active in Liberal Party politics.

His father was Colonel Domingo Reyes Rovira, originally from Managua, Nicaragua. His mother Juana Ogazón Velázquez-Delgado was the younger sister of the colonel's first wife, Guadalupe. He was the eldest of his mother's four children and had two half-siblings from his father's first marriage. His maternal cousins Pedro Ogazón and Ignacio Vallarta both served as Governors of Jalisco between 1858 and 1875.

Reyes studied law in the public schools in Guadalajara before beginning his military career at age fourteen, when he enlisted to fight against the Second French Empire in the 1861 French intervention in Mexico.

== Military career ==
=== Resistance to French intervention ===
In 1866, Reyes fought at Zacatecas and Calvillo as an ensign in the Centro Guías de Jalisco in the forces of General Trinidad García de la Cadena. The following year, at age seventeen, he joined the Jalisco lanceros and participated in the Siege of Querétaro, where he was wounded twice. He attended the execution of Emperor Maximilian I.

=== Suppression of rebels ===
After the intervention was expelled, Reyes participated in the suppression of rebellions by regional caudillos and rose swiftly through the ranks. At the Battle of La Mojonera in Zapopan, he fought with Ramón Corona against the caudillo Manuel Lozada, and single-handedly returned valuable information from behind enemy lines, evading a surprise attack. Following the battle, he was made comandante. He worked briefly in 1873 as a secretary to General Francisco Tolentino before returning to wage active campaigns against Lozada's supporters. In September 1875, Reyes received a bullet wound to his neck while suppressing a mutiny of his own troops with twenty loyal soldiers. He successfully evicted the mutineers from the barracks and was made a lieutenant colonel.

In July 1880, Reyes defeated the rebel Ramírez Terrón at the Battle of Villa Unión in Sinaloa. Though outnumbered three-to-one, Reyes repelled Terrón's initial attack and returned the charge with only a few soldiers, delivering fictitious orders to give the illusion of a larger force. Though he was presumed dead, Reyes survived with three wounds, including permanent damage to his right wrist, which was nearly amputated. Believing his forces were surrounded, Terrón committed suicide during the battle, leaving word to Reyes to care for Terrón's family. Reyes did so, providing a monthly pension for his daughters and a job for his widow. In recognition of his victory at Villa Unión, President Porfirio Díaz personally awarded Reyes a rare double promotion directly to the rank of brigadier general. As brigadier general, Reyes led all Mexican forces in Sinaloa, Sonora, and Baja California from August 13, 1880 to March 11, 1883. From March 12, 1883 to October 1885, he was in charge of the Sixth Military District, headquartered in San Luis Potosí.

== Political career and administration ==
The center of Reyes's political power was in his home state of Jalisco; Díaz's supporters closed Reyes clubs and jailed their leaders. His main support came from the middle class, many of whom had connections to the now disbanded Second Reserve. Reyes was seen as a reformer, anti-Científico, pro-business, with a strong following among professionals such as doctors and lawyers, and a viable candidate of the old order with both military and political experience who could manage a presidential transition. He was not an outsider or radical agitator.

Together with José Yves Limantour, he was considered one of the potential successors of Porfirio Díaz. With Francisco Madero's latter challenge to the dictator in the 1910 elections and, afterwards, initiation of the Mexican Revolution, previous notions of who should succeed Díaz were discarded.

== Mexican Revolution and death ==
For a time Reyes was a supporter of Madero, but he later led the first rebellion against Madero. After this rebellion failed, Reyes was imprisoned in the Mexico City prison of Santiago Tlatelolco. General Félix Díaz was imprisoned at another Mexico City jail for rebellion, but the two were able to easily communicate despite that and plot a joint coup against Madero. They tried to get General Victoriano Huerta to join the plot, but he declined, despite Huerta's being a protégé of Reyes's. General Manuel Mondragón sent forces to free Reyes from jail on 9 February 1913, who freed Reyes from prison. Then, they marched on to the National Palace in the beginning of the Ten Tragic Days. Reyes was killed on day 1 of the coup, in an assault on the palace. He had expected to enter the National Palace and declare Madero ousted. Before he could enter the building, Reyes was shot dead along with 400 others, among them civilians.

== Personal life ==
On November 4, 1872, Reyes married Aurelia de Ochoa y Sapién, the daughter of an aristocratic family from Zapotlán el Grande. They had twelve children, seven of whom survived to adulthood:

- Bernardo Reyes Ochoa (b. August 20, 1873), civil engineer who constructed the Temple of San Luis Gonzaga in Monterrey
- Rodolfo Reyes Ochoa (b. May 16, 1878), attorney who participated in the overthrow of Francisco I. Madero
- Maria Reyes Ochoa (b. 1880), wife of attorney Rafael Dávila Caballero, son of Governor of Nuevo Leon Narciso Dávila
- Amalia Reyes Ochoa, wife of attorney Fermín Sada
- Otilia Reyes Ochoa (b. 1888), wife of investor Ramón López León
- Alfonso Reyes Ochoa (b. May 17, 1889), internationally renowned writer
- Alejandro Reyes Ochoa

Five children died before reaching adulthood: Roberto, Aurelia, Eloísa, Guadalupe and Eva.

He was the grandfather of the painter Aurora Reyes.

On 25 December 1896, Reyes was present as Missouri defeated Texas in Monterrey in an exhibition, marking the first game of American football ever played in Mexico.
