= 1892 Mexican general election =

← 1888	1892	1896 →
- Presidential election
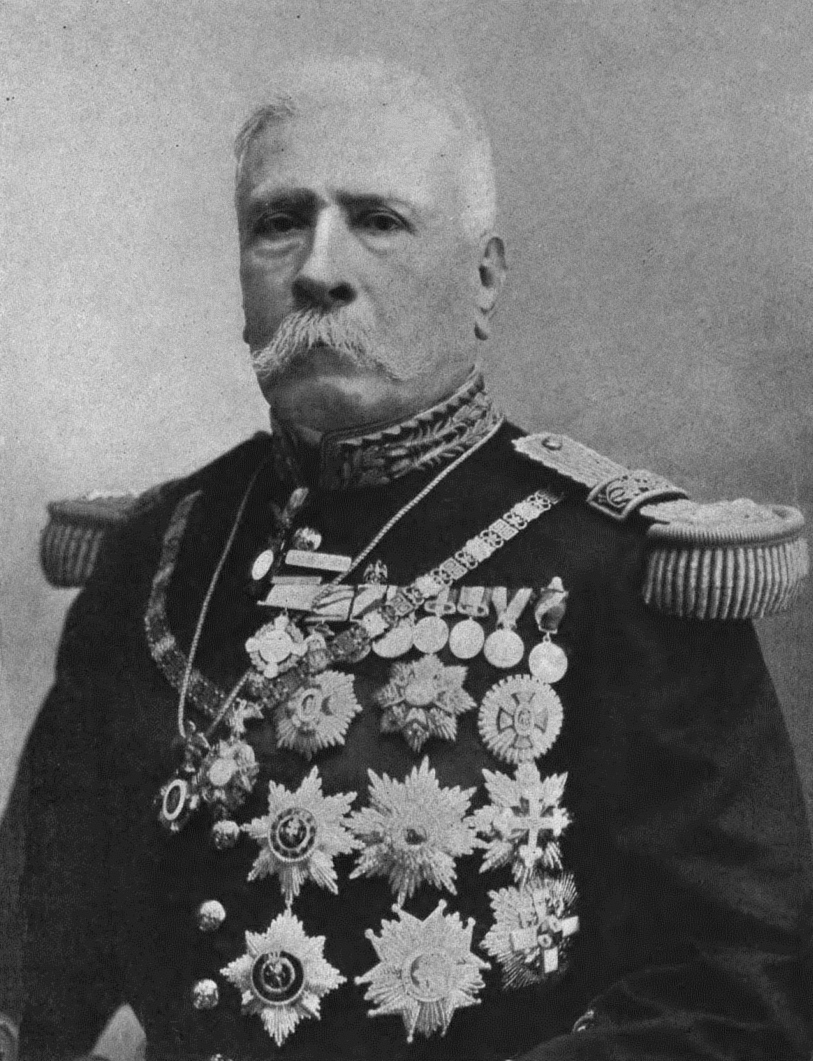
Nominee	Porfirio Díaz
Popular vote	17,298
Percentage	99.88%
President before election
Porfirio Díaz
Elected President
Porfirio Díaz

General elections were held in Mexico in 1892. Incumbent president Porfirio Díaz was re-elected with 99.9% of the vote.

== Results ==
=== President ===
Candidate	Votes	%
Porfirio Díaz	17,277	99.88
Other candidates	21	0.12
Total	17,298	100.00
Source: Ramírez Rancaño
