= 1896 Mexican general election =

← 1892	1896	1900 →
- Presidential election
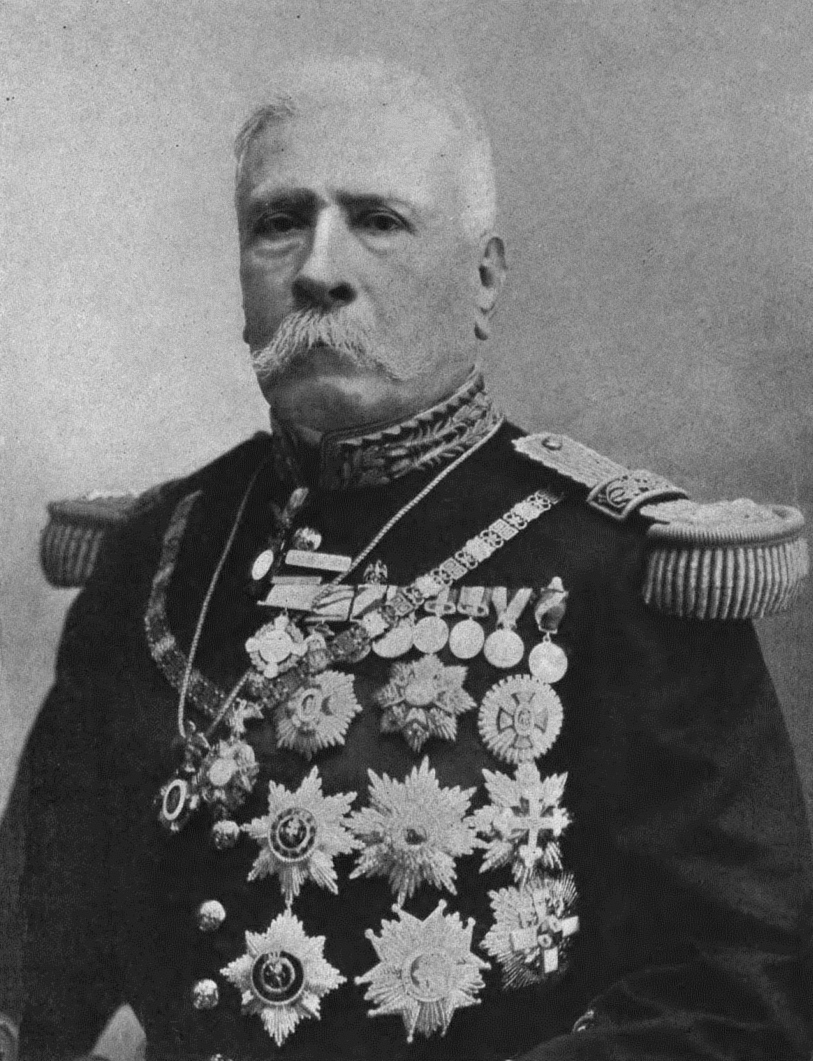
Nominee	Porfirio Díaz
Popular vote	17,416
Percentage	100%
President before election
Porfirio Díaz
Elected President
Porfirio Díaz

General elections were held in Mexico in 1896. Incumbent Porfirio Díaz was the only candidate for the presidency, and was re-elected with 100% of the vote.

== Results ==
=== President ===
Candidate	Votes	%
Porfirio Díaz	17,416	100.00
Total	17,416	100.00
Source: Ramírez Rancaño
