= Creel (surname) =

Creel is a surname. Notable people with the surname include:

== People ==
- The Creel-Terrazas family of Mexican politicians and industrialists:
  - Enrique Creel (1854–1931), Mexican politician and industrialist, namesake of Creel, Chihuahua
  - Lola Creel (born 1955), Mexican documentarian
  - Santiago Creel (born 1954), Mexican politician
- Gavin Creel (1976–2024), American actor and singer
- George Creel (1876–1953), American journalist, politician, and head of Committee on Public Information
- Herrlee Glessner Creel (1905–1994), American sinologist and philosopher
- Jack Creel (1916–2002), American Major League Baseball pitcher
- Leanna Creel (born 1970), American actress and film producer
- Walton Creel (born 1974), American artist
- William Jackson Creel, American doctor and namesake for several Florida structures

== Fictional characters ==
- Carl "Crusher" Creel, the Absorbing Man, in Marvel Comics universe
- Catalina Creel, a villain (played by the actresses María Rubio and Paz Vega) in the Mexican telenovelas Cuna de lobos (1986–87) and its remake (2019)
- Henry Creel, commonly known as Vecna, the main antagonist in the fourth season of Stranger Things
- Padishar Creel, a recurring character from the Shannara series by Terry Brooks, first appearing in The Scions of Shannara
- Panamon Creel, a character from the novel The Sword of Shannara by Terry Brooks
- Victor Creel, a recurring character in the fourth season of Stranger Things
