= Creel =

Creel and Creels can refer to:

- Creel (basket), a type of basket used in fly fishing and commercial fishing
- Creel (surname)
- Creel, Chihuahua, a town in Mexico
- Creel-Terrazas Family, a notable family in the Mexican state of Chihuahua
- a series of bobbins holding the roving on a spinning mule
- an overhead clothes airer
- a crater on Mars
- Creels, West Virginia
- Jargon for a type of fishing or shellfishing harvester interview to determine Catch Per Unit Effort

== See also ==
- Creal (disambiguation)
- Creole (disambiguation)
- Creelman, a surname
