= De Teresa =

De Teresa is a Spanish surname. Notable people with the surname include:

- Ana de Teresa (born 2001), Spanish footballer
- Jose de Teresa (1850–1902), Mexican businessman and politician
- Luz de Teresa (born 1965), Mexican and Spanish mathematician
- Tomás de Teresa (born 1968), Spanish middle distance runner

== See also ==
- Guillermo Ruiz de Teresa (born 1953), Mexican politician
- Guillermo Tovar y de Teresa (1956–2013), Mexican historian and art collector)
- Rafael Tovar y de Teresa (1954–2016), Mexican diplomat
