= Creo =

Creo or CREO may refer to:

- Creo (company), a Canadian company for imaging technology now part of Eastman Kodak Comp
- Creo (trade union), a Norwegian trade union for arts workers
- Commitment, Renewal and Order, a political party in Guatemala
- Creating Opportunities, a political party in Ecuador
- Critical rare-earth oxides, a group of rare-earth oxides defined by the US Department of Energy as "critical"
- PTC Creo, a suite of design software

== See also ==
- Cleo (disambiguation)
- Creel (disambiguation)
- Creole (disambiguation)
- CRIO
- KREO (disambiguation)
- Krio (disambiguation)
