= Restored Republic =

Period of Mexican history from 1867 to 1876

Mexican Republic República Mexicana
- 1867–1876
- Flag Coat of arms
- Anthem: "Himno Nacional Mexicano" (English: "National Anthem of Mexico")
- Government: Federal presidential republic
- President
  - 1867–1872: Benito Juárez
  - 1872–1876: Sebastián Lerdo de Tejada
- History
  - Fall of the Second Mexican Empire: May 1867
  - Porfirio Díaz ascends to the presidency: 15 February 1876

Population
  - 1871: 9,176,082
Preceded by	Succeeded by
Second Mexican Empire	Porfiriato

The Restored Republic (Spanish: República Restaurada) was the era of Mexican history between 1867 and 1876, starting with the liberal triumph over the Second French Intervention in Mexico and the fall of the Second Mexican Empire and ending with Porfirio Díaz's ascension to the presidency. It was followed by the three-decade dictatorship known as the Porfiriato.

The Liberal coalition that had weathered the French intervention split after 1867, to the point of resulting in armed conflict. Three men would dominate politics in this era: Benito Juárez, Porfirio Díaz, and Sebastián Lerdo de Tejada. Lerdo's biographer summed up the three ambitious men: "Juárez believed he was indispensable; while Lerdo regarded himself as infallible and Díaz as inevitable."

Juárez was seen by his supporters as the embodiment of the struggle for national liberation against the recent French invasion, but his continuation in office after 1865, when his term as president ended, led to accusations of autocracy, and opened the door to liberal rivals challenging his hold on power. In 1871, Juárez was challenged by General Porfirio Díaz under the Plan de la Noria, which objected to Juárez's hold on power. Juárez suppressed the rebellion, but died in office, after which Sebastián Lerdo de Tejada succeeded him as president. When Lerdo ran for a second term, Díaz once again rebelled in 1876, under the Plan of Tuxtepec. A year-long civil war ensued, with Lerdo's government troops waging war against the guerrilla tactics of Díaz and his supporters. Díaz triumphed in 1876 and began the next political era, the Porfiriato.

== History ==
=== Fall of the Empire ===
Napoleon III officially decided upon abandoning the Second French Intervention in Mexico as early as January 1866. French officials warned Emperor Maximilian that the Second Mexican Empire would not survive independently without French support, but the emperor did not abdicate, and as the last French troops departed in 1867, Maximilian and his supporters headed to Querétaro, northwest of Mexico City, to make a last stand. The last French troops departed in March, 1867 and the Empire hardly survived two months more. The Siege of Querétaro ended on May 15, 1867.

On June 13, while President Juárez was now in San Luis Potosí, the government of the Mexican Republic placed Maximilian on trial at the Iturbide Theater in Querétaro for aiding the French invasion of Mexico, attempting to overthrow the Mexican government, and prolonging the bloodshed when his cause was already lost. His leading Mexican generals Tomás Mejía and Miguel Miramón were placed on trial alongside him for treason. All three were found guilty and sentenced to death. President Juárez rejected multiple appeals for clemency, including multiple official appeals from European governments and the three prisoners were eventually shot by firing squad at the Hill of the Bells on June 19, 1867.

The capital returned to Republican rule shortly afterwards before the end of June, and President Juárez entered the city on the morning of July 15, accompanied by his ministers José María Iglesias and Sebastián Lerdo de Tejada who would both go on to play notable roles during the era of the Restored Republic.

=== Third Juárez presidency ===
==== Juárez Returns to Mexico City ====
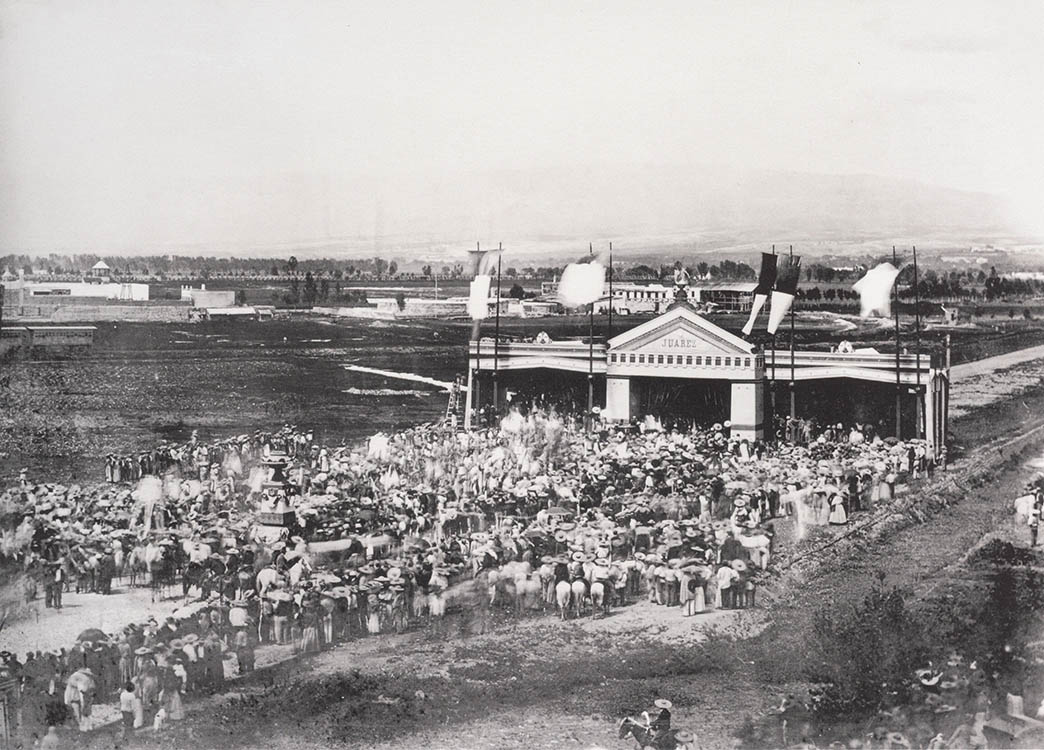
Triumphal arch set up for President Juárez' reentry into Mexico City.

Juárez reentered the capital on the morning of July 15, to public acclaim, the ringing of bells, and ceremonial artillery fire. He commuted the death sentences of several imperialists, but showed no mercy to the more important collaborators. Santiago Vidaurri was shot without even a trial. Juárez used his emergency presidential powers to abrogate a law of confiscation that was reducing collaborationist families to poverty, instead replacing their penalty with a fine.

Juárez reorganized his cabinet and reestablished the department of development. He decreed that the governments of the states should now return to their respective capitals. The army was also reduced in size. The Supreme Court was re-established under the presidency of Sebastián Lerdo de Tejada. Day to day judicial acts during the French occupation, such as the granting of marriage certificates, were decreed valid.

A political organization known as the Zaragoza Club lobbied the government to increase the integrity of elections and encourage foreign immigration. They also promoted the establishment of a permanent Pan-American congress.

Political disturbances broke out as soon as Juárez assumed his new term. The Caste War continued to flare up in Yucatán, and the Revolución de los Ríos had broken out among the Yaqui and the Mayo in Sonora. The latter would end in the Bacum Massacre in which Mexican troops killed over a hundred Yaqui men, women, and children. The government suppressed other minor insurrections.

A more serious insurrection occurred at the end of the year at San Luis Potosi, headed by Francisco Aguirre, Martinez, and Larranaga. It was joined by the governor of Zacatecas, Trinidad García de la Cadena, who placed himself at the head of the entire movement. Juárez declared an emergency and crushed the rebellion in four months. General Rocha defeated the insurgents on February 22, 1870, at a location known as Lo de Ovejo, after which they were dispersed.

On August 17, 1867, a long delayed law was published decreeing new elections to be held for the presidency and for the congress. An opposition party, calling itself constitutionalist and supporting the candidacy of Porfirio Díaz now emerged, but when elections were held in October, 1867 Juárez obtained a majority of the votes. On December 19 congress certified the election and he assumed office on the 25th.

On October 13, 1870, congress passed a general amnesty law absolving anyone accused of treason, with the exception of certain high officials and deserters who had worked with the Second Mexican Empire.

==== Elections of 1871 ====
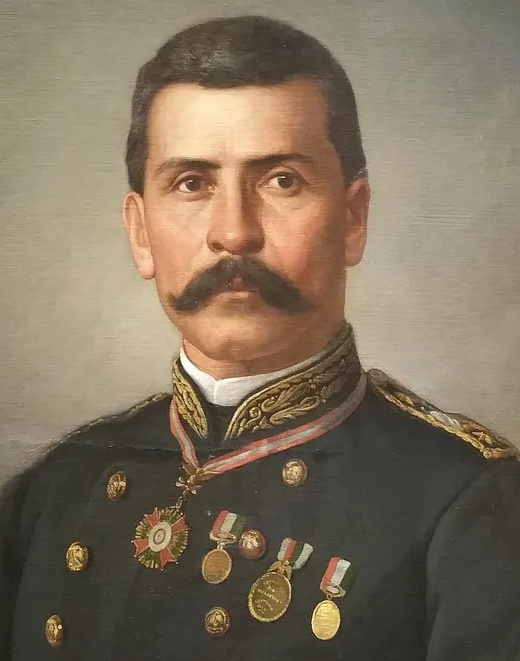
Porfirio Díaz

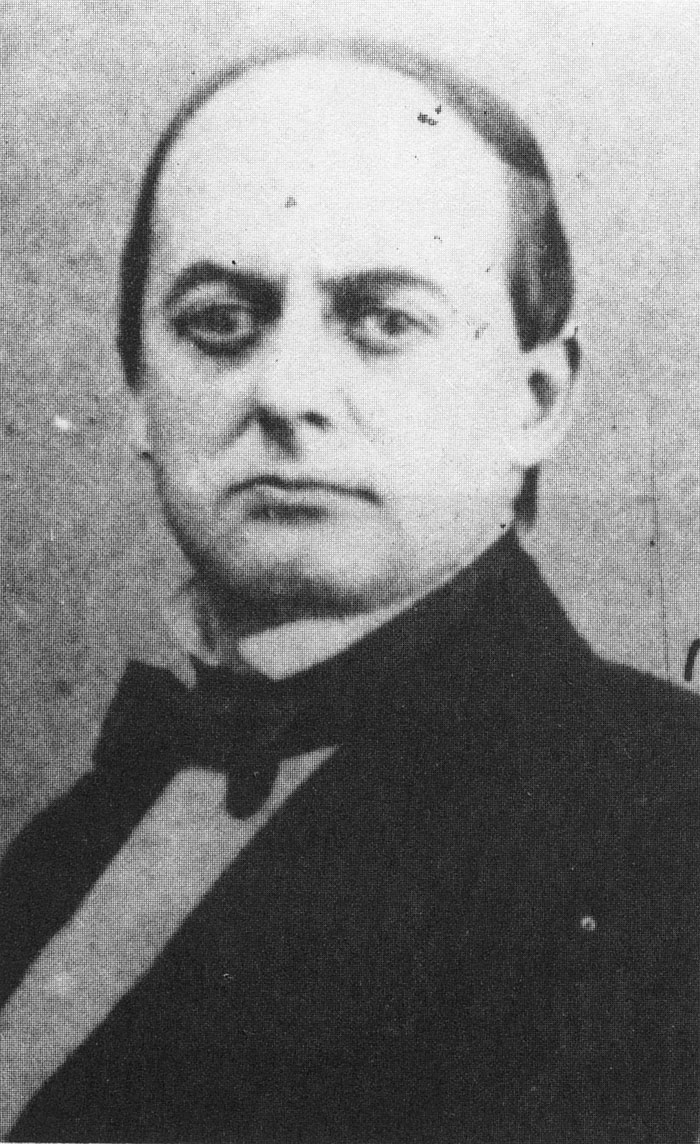
Sebastián Lerdo de Tejada

President Juárez had provoked opposition by choosing to retain the same ministers he had held during his term of emergency powers during the French Intervention. The opposition alleged that the elections of 1867 had been fraudulent, and Juárez was suspected of harboring unconstitutional ideas. This suspicion was increased when his ministers asked congress several times and particularly on 25 January 1868 to grant him stronger powers, which was done on May 8, 1868.

He further provoked opposition, when he decided to run for office again in 1871. Juárez had great prestige and substantial support, but liberal critics believed that successive reelections were against the spirit of democracy. The other prominent candidates were Sebastian Lerdo de Tejada and Porfirio Díaz. None of the candidates achieved a majority and the selection of the winner then fell upon congress which on October 12, 1871, chose Juárez who was inaugurated on December 1 amidst accusations of electoral fraud.

==== Plan de la Noria ====
Among the opposition to Juárez were found certain congressmen who petitioned Porfirio Díaz to take up arms against the government. On November 8, 1871, he issued from the town of La Noria a manifesto proclaiming loyalty to the constitution of 1857 and electoral freedom, and called forth a plan for reconstituting the nation.

The rebels gained support throughout the country, but suffered a significant defeat at Cerro de la Bufa in Zacatecas. Díaz approached Mexico City with a column of cavalry but then turned towards Jalisco when support from within Mexico City was found to be unreliable.

In the early part of June, 1872 while fighting was still ongoing Juarez suffered a ministerial crisis. Matías Romero and Castillo Velasco resigned, and Juarez had to shuffle his cabinet, with Joaquín Ruiz refusing the offer to serve as Minister of Justice and Public instruction.

President Juárez began to experience heart problems in July, 1872 and he died on the 18th, before the Plan of La Noria had been entirely suppressed. The presidency passed to Sebastian Lerdo de Tejada who as President of the Supreme Court was next in the line of succession.

=== Lerdo presidency ===
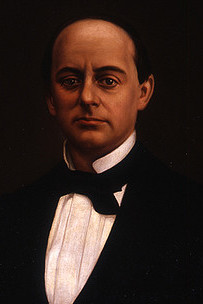
President Sebastian Lerdo de Tejada

Lerdo retained Juárez' ministers, and proposed an amnesty to the Noria rebels. Most of the insurgents accepted.

Porfirio Díaz however rejected the amnesty and on August 1 sent his response to the president, threatening future insurrection in case the government did not reform, and urging the government to pass measures to protect the integrity of elections. President Lerdo was unyielding and made it clear that he would not negotiate with Díaz. By the end of September most of the revolutionary forces had accepted the amnesty. The revolution increasingly dissipated as its entire motive, the removal of Juárez, had been rendered irrelevant by his death. On October 26, Díaz finally unconditionally accepted President Lerdo's amnesty.

In 1873, the Lerdo government had to deal with an insurrection led by the indigenous leader, Manuel Lozada in Tepic in the western part of the country. He was captured and executed in August.

The question of finances, railroad development, and internal security continued to occupy congress and the presidency. Murder and kidnapping was so rampant that on May 2, 1873, President Lerdo brought the matter before congress which subsequently proclaimed martial law against bandits, even allowing summary executions for such individuals caught in the act, with suspected bandits to be tried, and if found guilty to be executed within fifteen days with no possibility of appeals.

The Lerdo presidency continued to enforce and add to the anti-clerical reform laws first passed in the 1850s. Two hundred nuns in Mexico City were expelled from their communities, and certain Jesuits and nuns were banished from the country. The establishment of monastic orders was late completely outlawed and this measure was incorporated into the constitution. Protestants and Mormons were also at this being allowed to settle in the nation and establish missions.

From 1874 to 1876 the government faced no major military coups, although a few local disturbances did flare up. Violence was nonetheless rampant throughout the nation, the aforementioned law against bandits being extended, and a decree of 1875 stripping them of all citizen's rights within the court system.

Amidst increasing opposition to his rule, such as from prominent liberal general Vicente Riva Palacio who accused the president of violating the constitution, Lerdo decided to run for reelection in 1876.

==== Plan of Tuxtepec ====
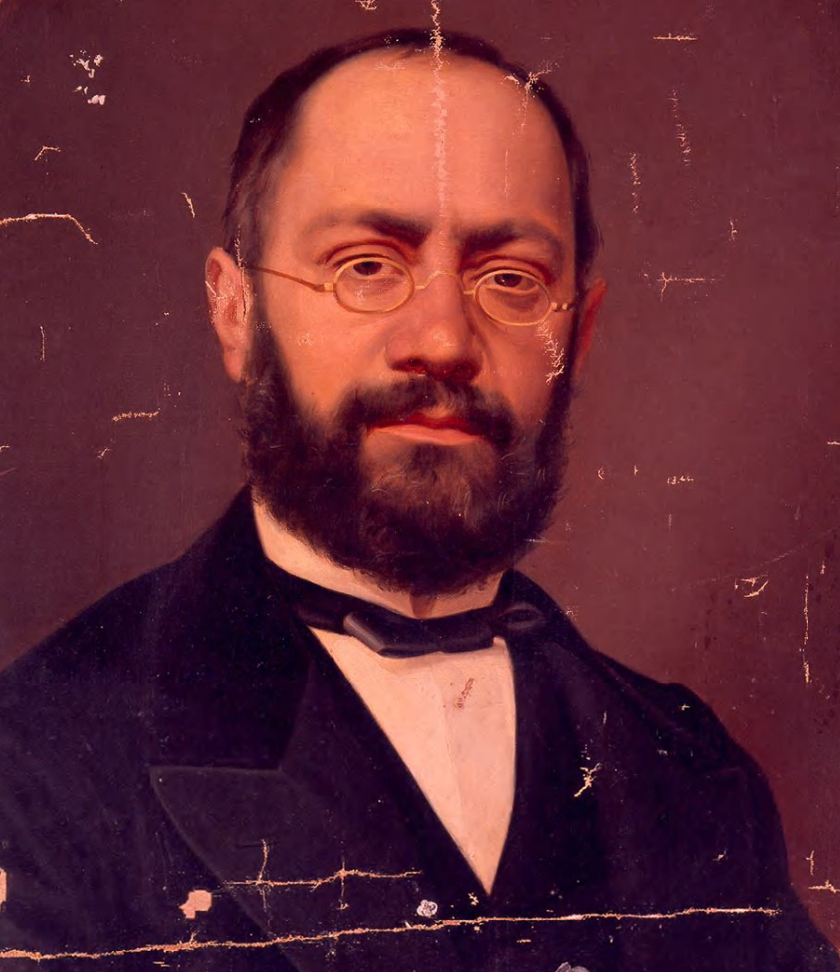
José María Iglesias who claimed the presidency against both Lerdo and Diaz

On January 15, 1876, General Fidencio Hernandez in Oaxaca issued a pronuniciamiento against Lerdo in the town of Tuxtepec. He marched against Oaxaca City with two thousand poorly armed indigenous troops and the garrison there joined him without firing a shot. The revolutionary army then declared Porfirio Díaz to be their leader.

By March, the insurgency had spread throughout the entire country, and government forces began to clash with the rebels. Mariano Escobedo succeeded in pacifying Michoacan, while the loyalist General Alatorre was repulsed at Oaxaca.

General Díaz meanwhile had crossed over to the United States from which he published a reformed version of the Plan of Tuxtepec. He condemned Lerdo for interfering with elections and with the affairs of state governments.

In November, 1876, president of the supreme court José María Iglesias condemned the presidential elections that had just occurred as fraudulent, and from the town of Salamanca, Guanajuato, called upon the nation to overthrow Lerdo. Iglesias now, claiming to be president headed to Guanajuato with two of his chosen ministers, Guillermo Prieto and Felipe Berriozábal, where they were received with great enthusiasm.

Lerdo now had to deal with two independent insurrections against him. On November 15, government forces under the command of Alatorre suffered an egregious defeat at Huamantla. Lerdo was forced to flee the capital after handing it over to the Porfirista general Francisco Loaeza. He thereafter fled the country for the United States and took up residence in New York City.

=== Triumph of Porfirio Díaz ===
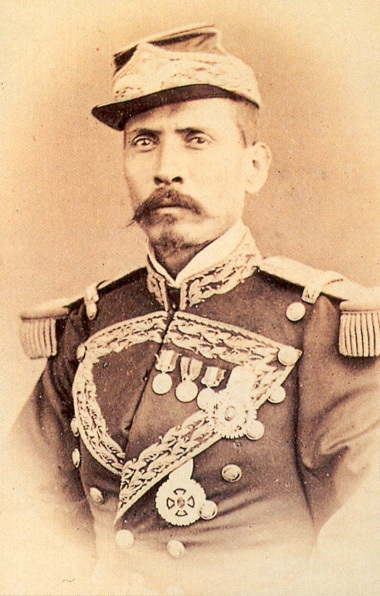
Porfirio Díaz

The country was now divided between supporters of Iglesias and supporters of Díaz. After months of uncertainty, troop movements, and negotiations, Iglesias conceded the presidency to Díaz by the end of 1876.

Díaz entered the capital and assumed the presidency on February 15, 1877. Díaz released a manifesto emphasizing the liberal progressive character of his movement and inviting men of all factions to cooperate within his government, in contrast to Lerdo, who had kept the same clique of Juaristas throughout his presidency. New elections were held for the presidency and Díaz was the victor, his term scheduled to expire on November 30, 1880.

In spite of revolting against Lerdo, in part to oppose his reelection, Díaz himself, with one exception in 1880, would proceed to be reelected repeatedly until his reign became a de facto dictatorship which would not end until the Mexican Revolution in 1911. His reign was an autocratic one, yet it would also be one of unprecedented national peace and economic development. It would come to be known as the Porfiriato.

== Government ==
The Constitution of 1857 continued to be in effect through the era of the Restored Republic.

The political society known as the Zaragoza Club lobbied the government to establish two chambers in congress and to strengthen the powers of local government.

An 1867 Referendum held by President Juárez contained questions of amending the constitution, notably on establishing a two chamber legislature, and on granting the president a veto the latter of which had been temporarily granted to him to deal with the French invasion. The referendum resulted in a minor constitutional crisis as it was not clear to critics of the president in congress that it was within the president's powers to hold such a referendum. The crisis was resolved by agreeing not to count the results and the constitution was subsequently not amended.

== Science and Education ==
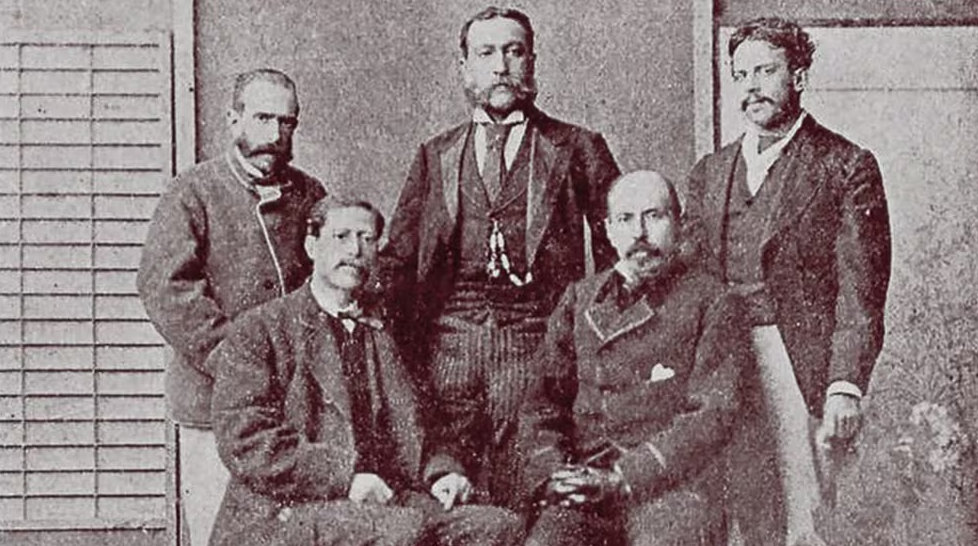
Mexican astronomical commission tasked with observing the 1874 transit of Venus in Japan. Back Row: Francisco Jiménez, Francisco Díaz Covarrubias, Francisco Bulnes. Front Row: Agustín Barroso, Manuel Fernández Leal.

The restored President Juárez used the emergency powers he still had from the French Intervention, to found schools of medicine, jurisprudence, engineering, fine and mechanical arts, agriculture, along with a school for the deaf and the dumb.

The Restored Republic continued the program of primary school construction which had begun decades earlier with the First Republic. There were 5000 primary schools in 1870, which had increased to 8,100 by 1875.

In 1871, a commission led by Manuel Fernández Leal, the acting Minister of Development, surveyed and mapped the Isthmus of Tehuantepec, during which the engineer Agustín Barroso, also cataloged the variety of local plants.

In 1873 Dr. José Eleuterio González, professor of natural history, compiled a survey of the flora for the vicinity of Monterrey. In 1874 Joaquín Dondé Ibarra, published a survey of the flora of Yucatán.

The construction of a national observatory at Chapultepec was decreed in December, 1876, and construction would be completed two years later.

A Mexican Society of Natural History was founded in 1868 and the following year began publishing its journal La Naturaleza (Nature). A Jalisco Engineers Society was founded in 1869. A Mexican Geological Society was decreed in 1875, and soon counted among its members notable scientists from both Mexico and abroad.

== Culture ==
=== Literature ===
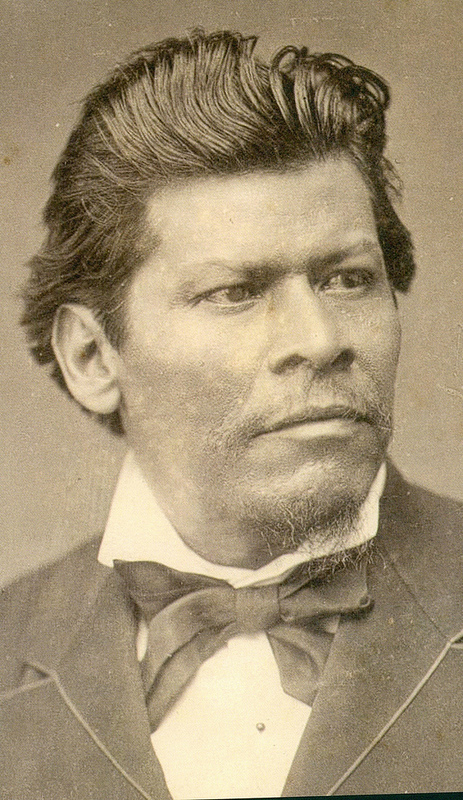
Ignacio Manuel Altamirano

Vicente Riva Palacio, statesman and general who had fought against the French invasion, pioneered the genre of Mexican historical fiction during this period, publishing seven novels in the period from 1868 to 1870. Don Jose Tomar de Cuellar similarly published work in the genre in the era of the Restored Republic.

Ignacio Manuel Altamirano, who had also taken up arms against the French invasion launched the literary journal El Renacimiento (The Renaissance) in 1869 Contributors would include Ignacio Ramírez, Guillermo Prieto, Ignacio Montes de Oca y Obregón, José María Roa Bárcena, Manuel Payno, Riva Palacio, Justo Sierra, and Manuel Acuña. Altamirano began his own output of novels during this time, serializing his novel Clemancia in El Renacimiento, starting in 1869, and La Navidad en Las Montañas (Christmas in the Mountains), which began serialization in La Iberia in 1870.

Manuel Payno published his costumbrista novel Tardes nubladas (Cloudy Afternoons) in 1871.

The poet José Peón Contreras published Romances Históricos mexicanos (Mexican Historical Ballads), a collection of poetry in 1873.

One of the most prolific playwrights of the time was Don Juan Antonio Mateos, producing fourteen plays in the period from 1867 and 1877.Other playwrights active during the Restored Republic included Manuel Peredo, Enrique de Olavarría y Ferrari, and Justo Sierra.

The historian and statesman, Francisco Bulnes began his literary career during this period, not through a work of history however, but through a travelogue Sobre el Hemisferio Norte Once Mil Leguas (Eleven Thousand Leagues Over the Northern Hemisphere), detailing his participation in the Mexican scientific commission tasked with observing the 1874 transit of Venus from Japan.

The Mexican Academy of Language was founded in 1875 and began compiling a dictionary of Mexican Spanish.

=== Art Gallery ===
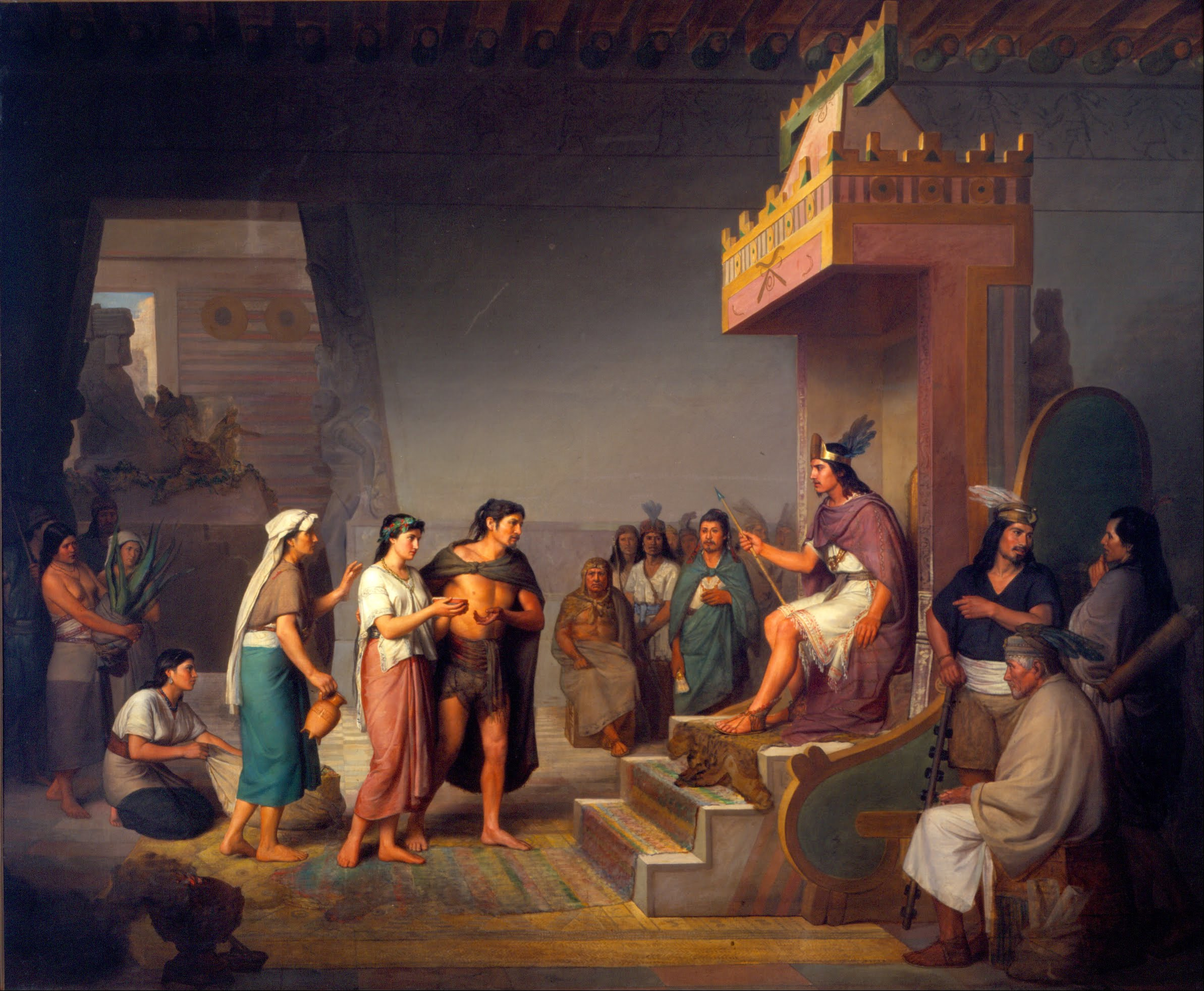
El descubrimiento del pulque (1869) by José María Obregón

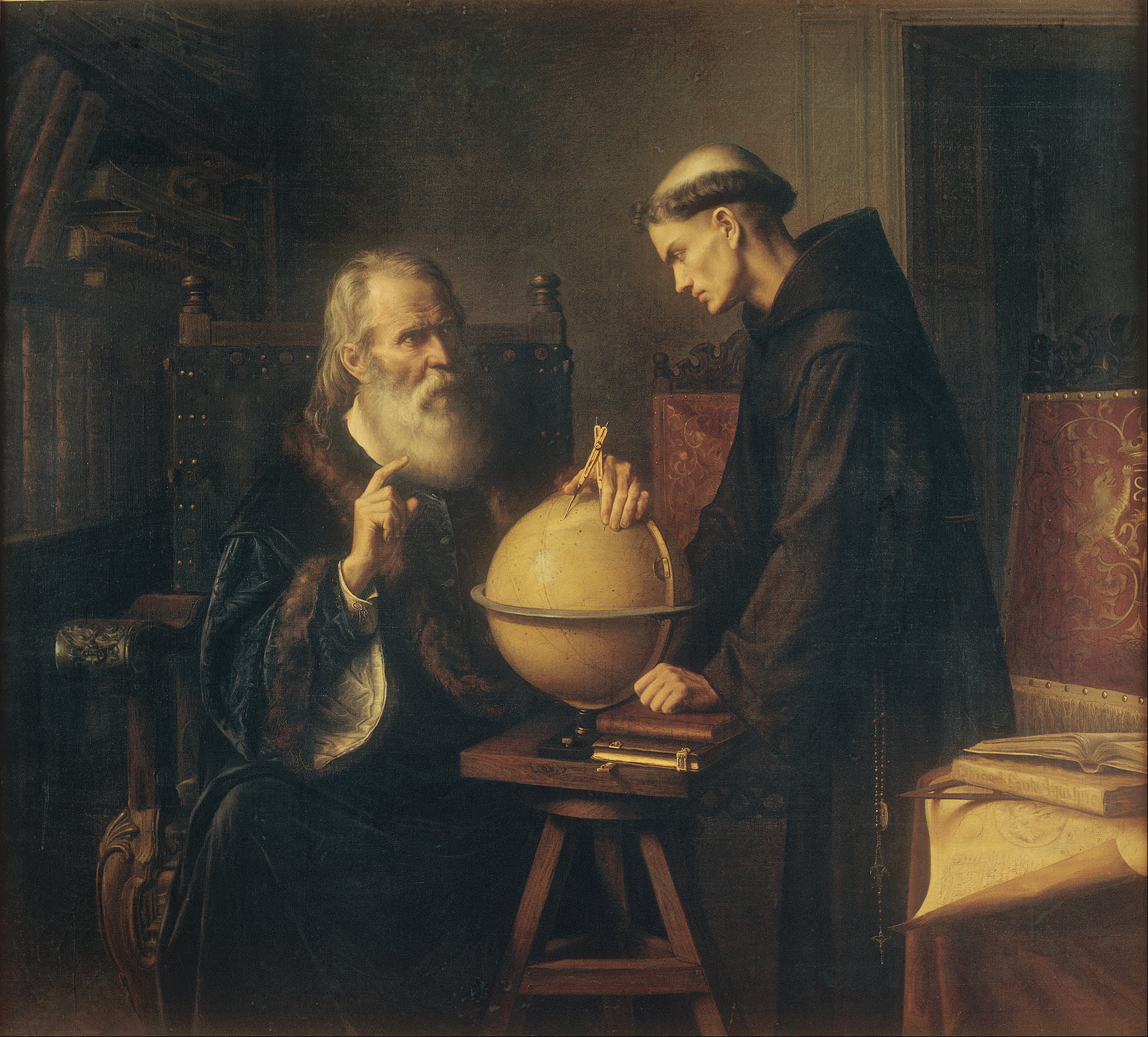
Galileo en la Universidad de Padua demostrando las nuevas teorías astronómicas (1873) by Félix Parra

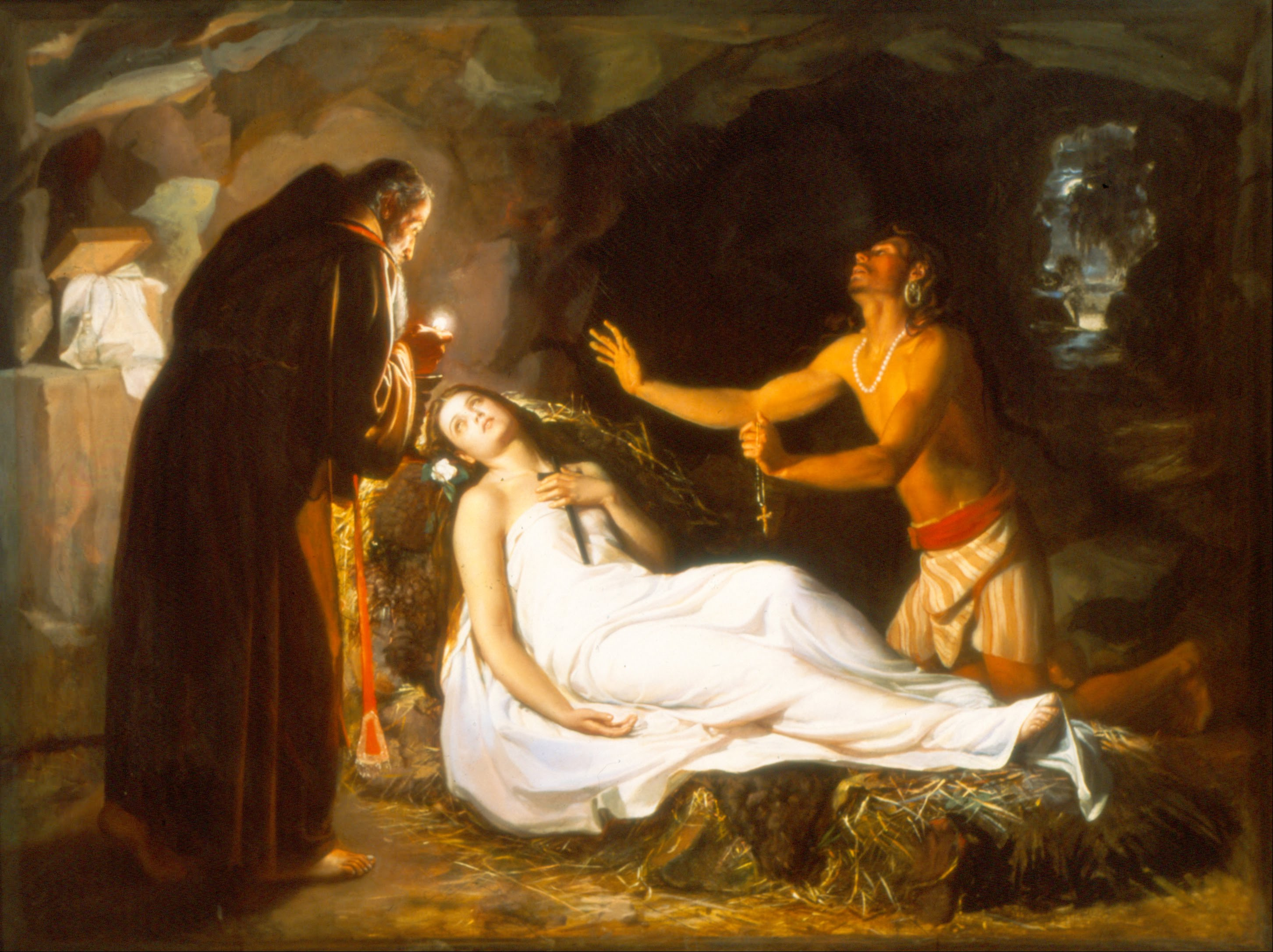
Últimos momentos de Atala (1871) by Luis Monroy.
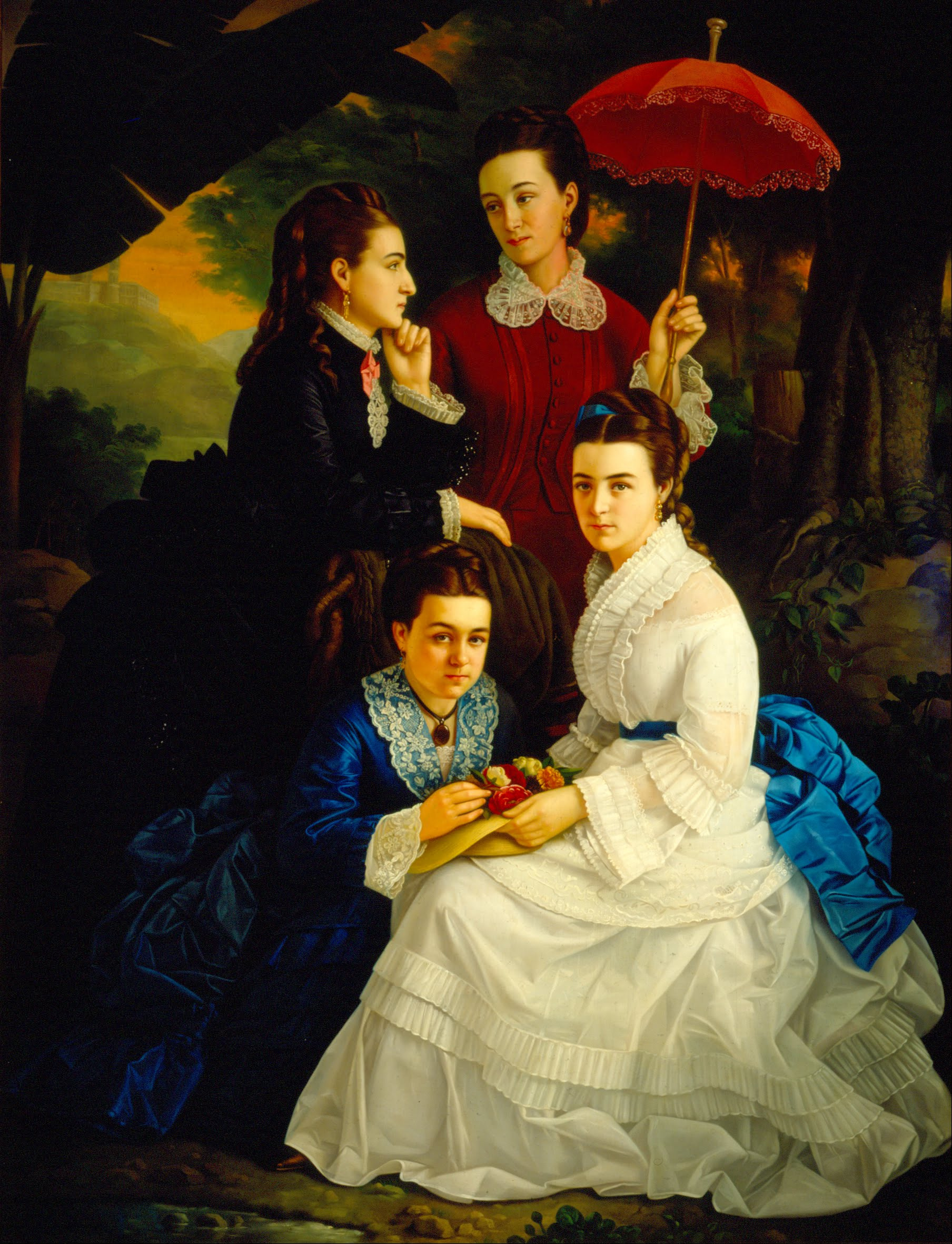
Retrato de las hijas del licenciado Manuel Cordero (1875) by Juan Cordero.

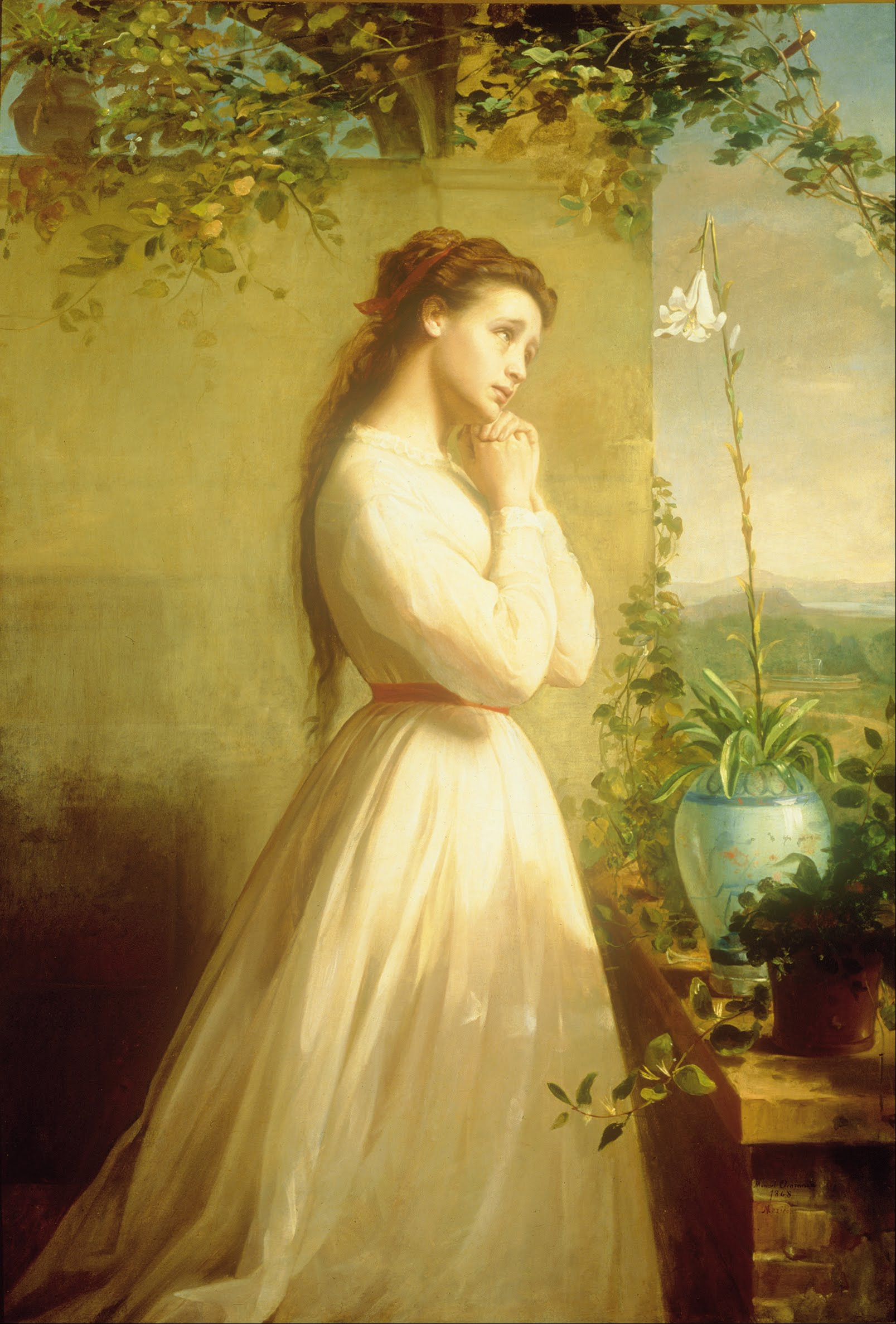
La flor muerta (1868) by Manuel Ocaranza.

== Economy ==
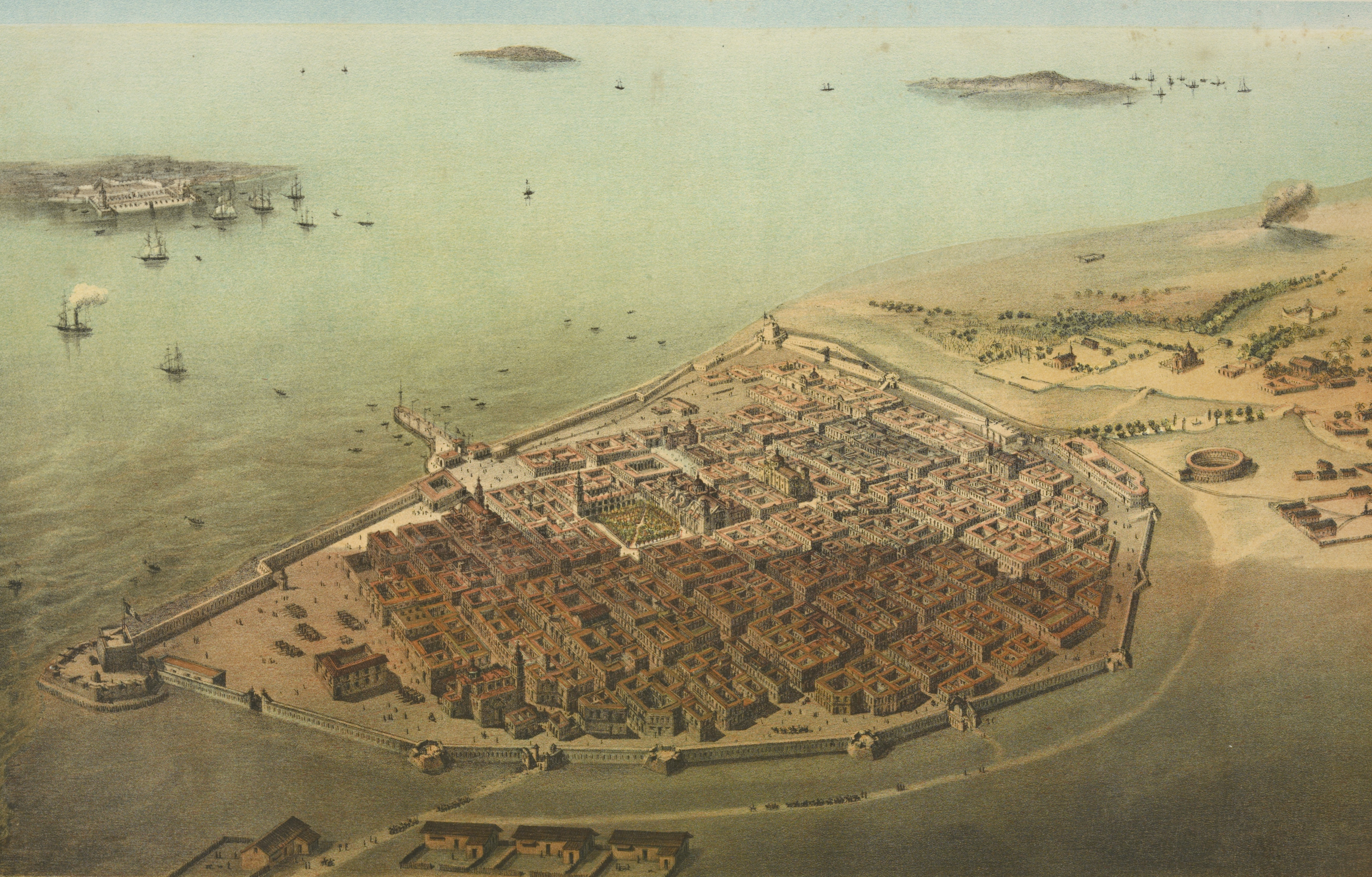
Port of Veracruz in 1869

=== Trade ===
By 1875, Great Britain was Mexico's largest source of manufactured goods, mainly in the field of cotton goods.

In 1872, the government passed measures for increasing naval patrols to cut down on smuggling.

Mexico's tariff laws were liberalized in 1872, abolishing all prohibition of specific goods, but maintaining set duties.

The Restored Republic liberalized the fishing industry in 1872, making it free for all citizens to engage in fishing and other marine industries including pearl diving. Mexican vessels were exempt from all taxation. Other regulations were passed to protect the industry and maintain order within it.

The industrial and agricultural fairs and exhibitions which had begun under the Second Federal Republic of Mexico continued throughout this period, and in 1876, Mexico was invited to join the Centennial Exposition at Philadelphia, where Mexican exhibitors won 73 diplomas and 47 medals.

=== Infrastructure ===
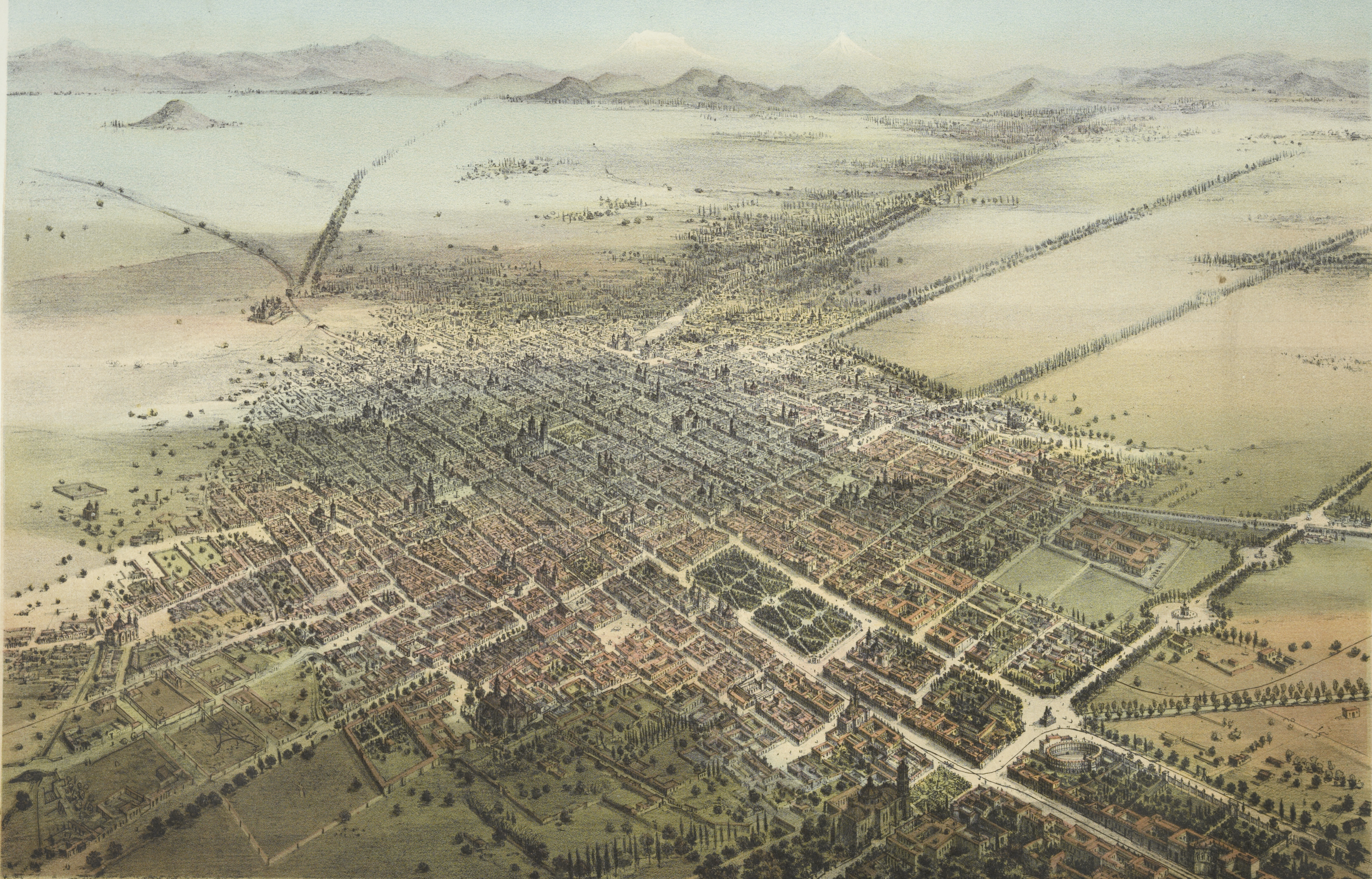
Mexico City in 1869

Upon being restored to power, President Juarez used his emergency powers in order to grant commissions for the continuation of the construction of railroads along the Isthmus of Tehuantepec and from Mexico City to Veracruz.The Restored Republic finally saw the completion of the Veracruz to Mexico City railway line which had been attempted since the era of the Centralist Republic. President Lerdo opened the line on January 1, 1873, with a ceremony and festivities.

In 1871, the government set aside funds for the laying of submarine cables to provide communications with the United States, Central America, and South America.

Extensive drainage projects for the Valley of Mexico were engaged in throughout the Restored Republic to mitigate flooding and improve sanitary conditions.

A an audit of Mexico's telegraphic network presented by the Ministry of Development to Congress in 1870, reported that there were four government lines then in operation: one from Mexico City to Leon, through Queretaro; one from Queretaro to San Luis Potosi, with a branch from Dolores Hidalgo to Guanajuato; one from San Luis Potosi to Matehuala, with a branch from Saltillo to Monterrey; and one from Sisal to Mérida. There were also five lines then being subsidized by the government some under construction: one from Tlalpan to Cuernavaca; one from Mexico City to Toluca; one from Zacatecas to Durango; and one from Durango to Mazatlán, and one from Veracruz to Tampico and Minatitlan. There were two lines which had been constructed by state governments: one from Oaxaca to Tehuacán and one from Zacatecas to San Luis Potosi. There were also five private lines then in operation. In total Mexico's telegraphic network then amounted to 4,789 kilometers of lines connecting 118 stations.

=== Finance ===
This era marked an increase in government revenue averaging about $15,000,000 yearly as compared with the era before 1861 during which revenues of $11,000,000 were never exceeded.

== Military ==
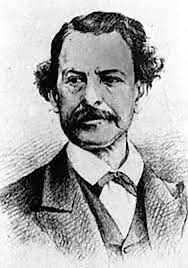
Ignacio Mejía, Minister of War during the entire period of the Restored Republic.

The Mexican frontier still struggled with Indian raids, though the problem during this era was rapidly diminishing along the northern frontier, and the danger mainly remained in Yucatan.

During this time the government appointed a commission for studying the question of founding military colonies. The reports were completed in 1871, concluding that military colonies were not the most efficient way of settling the Mexican frontier, and instead advocating the establishment of military posts for the protection of Mexican villages, or the foundation of rural companies which would be more economically viable.

A military college in Tacubaya was moved and reestablished at Chapultepec in 1867 to become the nation's premier military academy, training cadets for every branch of service.

Two ironclads were added to the Mexican Navy during this period, being built at Liverpool and arriving at Veracruz in September, 1875.

== Sources ==
- Alcocer, Gabriel (1903). "trabajos emprendidos acerca de la flora mexicana". La Naturaleza (in Spanish). 2 (3).
- Bancroft, Hubert Howe (1885). History of Mexico: 1824–1861 . San Francisco: A.L. Bancroft & Co.
- Bancroft, Hubert Howe (1888). History of Mexico: 1861–1887 . San Francisco: A.L. Bancroft & Co.
- Sierra, Justo (1901). Mexico Su Evolucion Social Tomo II (in Spanish).
- Gonzalez Peña, Carlos (1968). History of Mexican Literature (3rd ed.).
- Handbook of Learned Societies and Institutions of American. Washington D.C.: Carnegie Institution of Washington. 1908.
