= Científico =

Circle of technocratic advisors to President of Mexico Porfirio Díaz

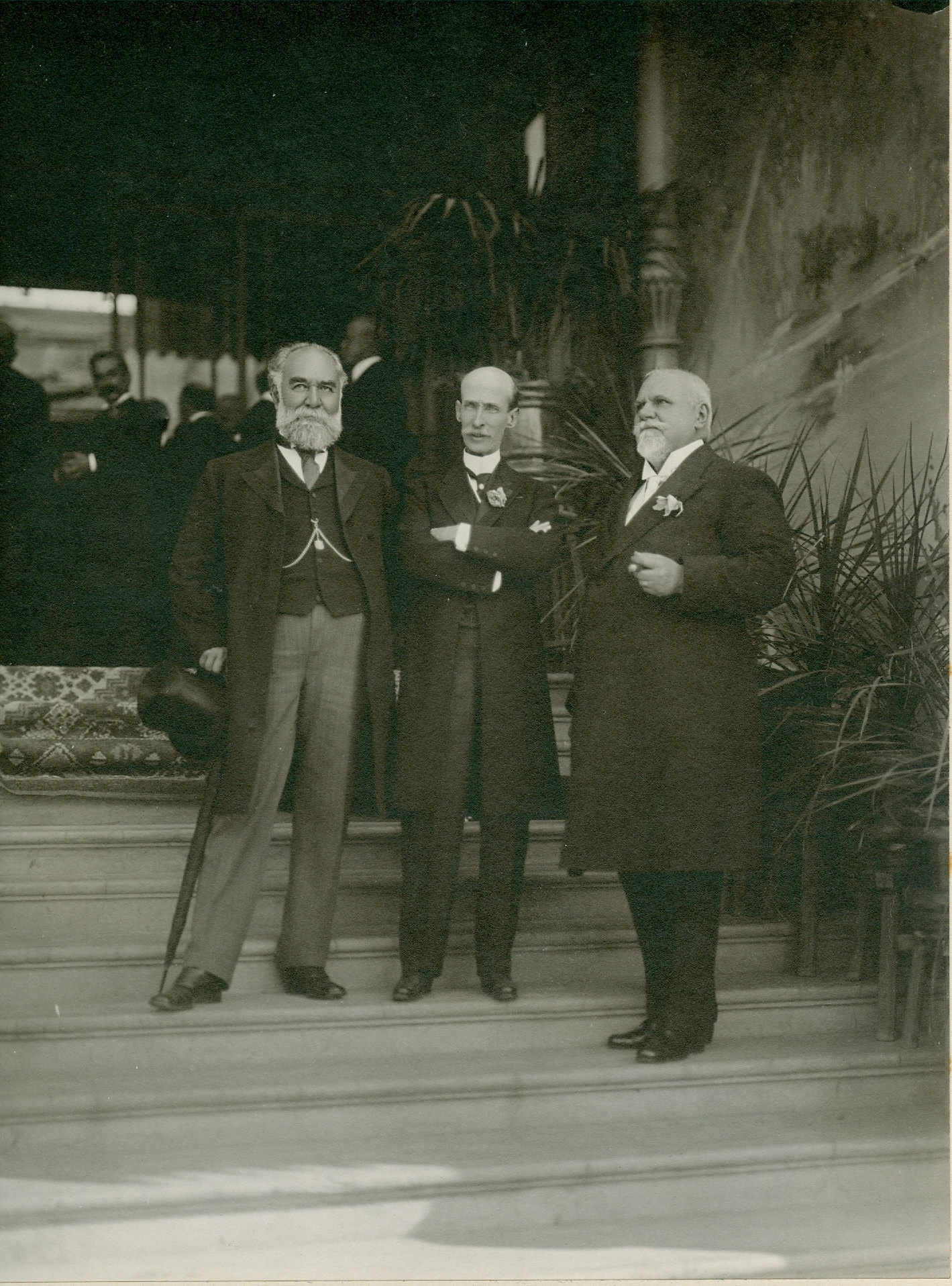
Antonio V. Hernández Benavides and Pablo Macedo Saravia, founders of the Banco Central Mexicano (Mexican Central Bank) with Justo Sierra, minister for Education

The Científicos (from Spanish: "scientists" or "those scientifically oriented") were a circle of technocratic advisors to President of Mexico Porfirio Díaz. Steeped in the positivist "scientific politics", they functioned as part of his program of modernization at the start of the 20th century.

== Notable "Científicos" ==
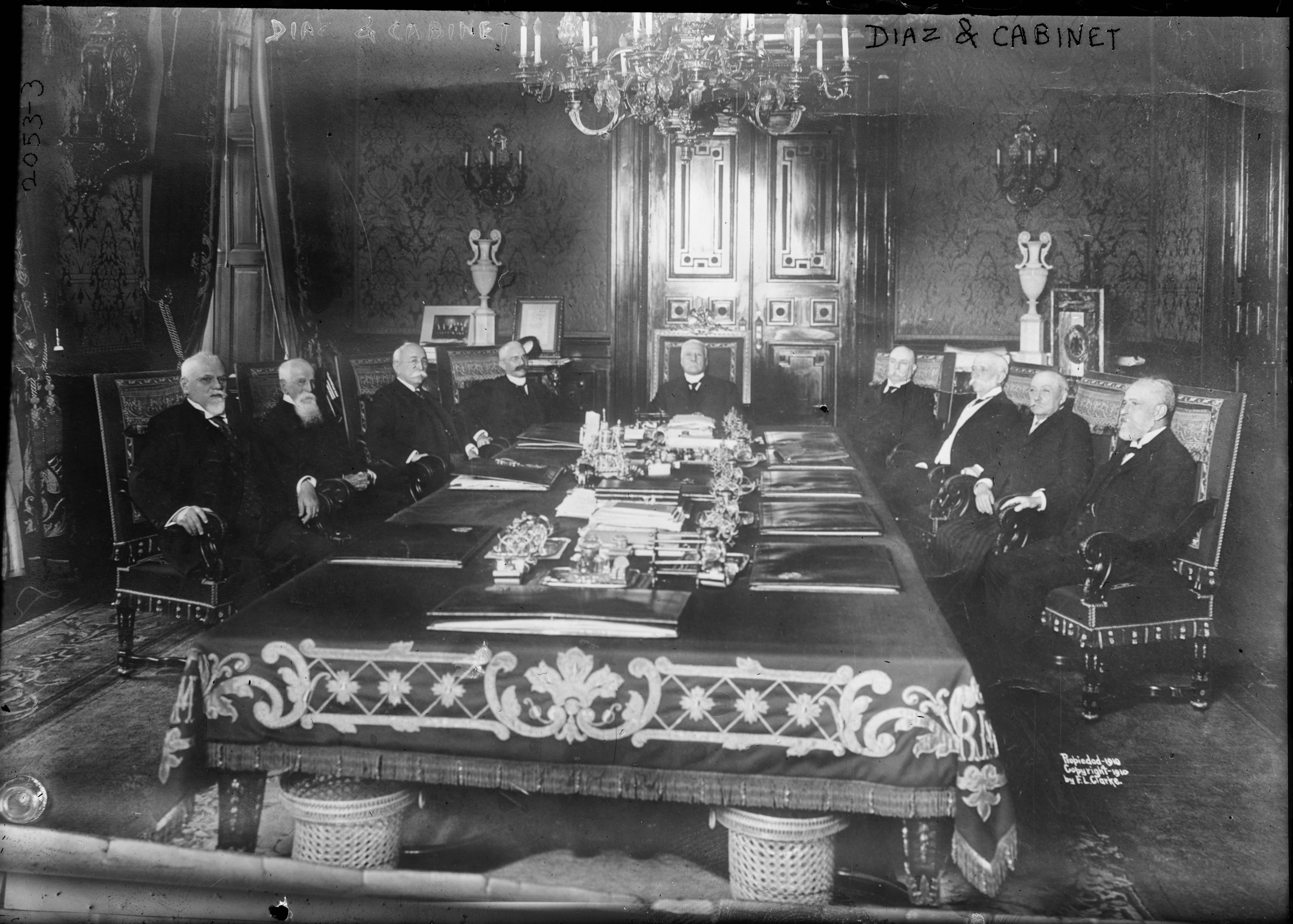
Left to right: Justo Sierra, Luis Terrazas, Olegario Molina, Vice President Ramón Corral, President Porfirio Díaz, Enrique Creel, José Yves Limantour, Manuel González de Cosío, Antonio V. Hernández

Leading Científicos included:

- Gabino Barreda (1820–1881), a precursor of the group. A physician and professor of medicine, Barreda studied in Paris under Auguste Comte between 1847 and 1851 and is widely credited with introducing positivism in Mexico. Put in charge of fulfilling the 1857 Constitution's promise of secular public education by the early Juárez government, Barreda organized the National Preparatory School, the first secular school of higher learning in Mexico, which opened in 1868 and became the training ground for many of the younger Científicos.
- Manuel Romero Rubio (1828–1895), Secretary of the Interior from 1884 to 1895 was founding member of the group, and its original leader and protector. With his death, Limantour –his political protégé– commenced to direct the Científicos. He also was the father-in-law of Porfirio Díaz.
- José Yves Limantour (1854–1935), Ministro de Hacienda (Secretary of the Treasury) from 1893 until the fall of the Díaz regime in 1911; considered the political leader of the faction.
- Justo Sierra, the leading intellectual and spokesman of the circle.
- The writers and journalists Francisco Bulnes (1847–1924) and Emilio Rabasa (1856–1930), co-founders of the newspaper El Universal (in 1888), both considered spokesmen for the Científicos.
- Enrique Creel (1854–1931), a wealthy businessman and landowner, an influential member of the powerful Creel-Terrazas Family that dominated the northern state of Chihuahua, of which he was governor from 1904 until the fall of the Díaz regime in 1911.
- Luis Terrazas (1829–1923), Founder of the Creel-Terrazas Family, father-in-law of Enrique Creel, and one of the richest landowners in the Republic of Mexico; he helped to bankroll the faction.
- The lawyers Pablo Macedo and Joaquín Casasús.
- Antonio V. Hernández Benavides, co-founder of the Banco Central Mexicano, senator and interim governor of Coahuila, uncle to president Francisco I. Madero.
- Nemesio García Naranjo (1883–1963), who later became Secretary of Education under Victoriano Huerta in 1913.
- Emilio Pimentel, lawyer, governor of Oaxaca from 1902 to 1911.
- Rosendo Pineda, lawyer, influential backer of Porfirio Díaz in the state of Oaxaca.
- Rafael Reyes Spíndola (1860–1922), founder (in 1896) and publisher of the Mexico City newspaper El Imparcial, considered the "semi-official newspaper of the Porfiriato."

There were other factions within the Díaz government that were opposed to the Científicos, most notably that led by former general Bernardo Reyes.

== See also ==
- Liberalism in Mexico
- Porfiriato
- Porfirio Díaz

== Sources ==
- Hernández Chávez, Alicia. Mexico: A Brief History. (Berkeley: University of California Press, 2006), p. 194.
- Ruiz, Ramón Eduardo. Triumphs and Tragedy: A History of the Mexican People (New York: Norton, 1992), p. 274
- Martínez Vázquez, Víctor Raúl, editor. La revolución en Oaxaca, 1900-1930, p. 38.
