= Enrique Creel =

Mexican politician and banker (1854–1931)

Enrique C. Creel
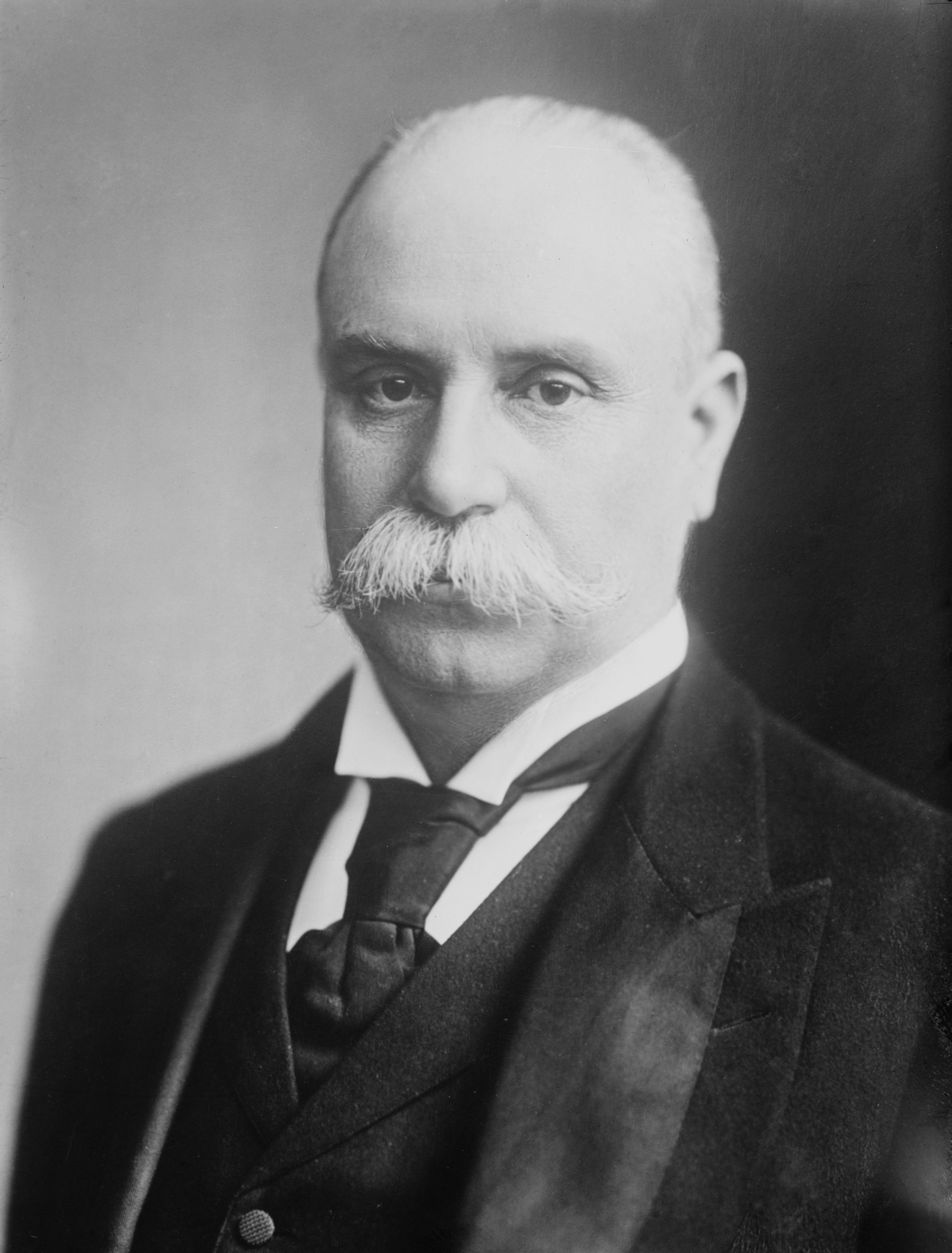

Minister of Foreign Affairs
- In office April 1910 – March 1911
- President: Porfirio Díaz
- Preceded by: Ignacio Mariscal
- Succeeded by: Francisco León de la Barra

Governor of Chihuahua
- In office 4 October 1907 – April 1910
- Preceded by: José María Sánchez
- Succeeded by: José María Sánchez
- In office 18 August 1904 – December 1906
- Preceded by: Luis Terrazas
- Succeeded by: José María Sánchez

Personal details
- Born: 30 August 1854 Chihuahua, Chihuahua
- Died: 18 August 1931 (aged 76) Mexico City
- Relatives: Luis Terrazas (father-in-law); Santiago Creel (great-grandson); Lola Creel (great-granddaughter)
- Education: University of Pennsylvania

José Enrique Clay Ramón de Jesús Creel Cuilty, sometimes known as Henry Clay Creel (30 August 1854 – 18 August 1931) was a Mexican businessman, politician and diplomat, member of the powerful Creel-Terrazas family of Chihuahua. He was a member of the Científicos, as well as founder and president of the Banco Central Mexicano, vice-president of Kansas City, Mexico and Orient Railway, as well as governor of Chihuahua on two occasions, ambassador of Mexico to the United States, and Minister of Foreign Affairs of President Porfirio Díaz in the last years of his regime. The foremost banker during the Porfirato (1876–1910), he is considered a symbol of the Porfirian regime.

== Biography ==
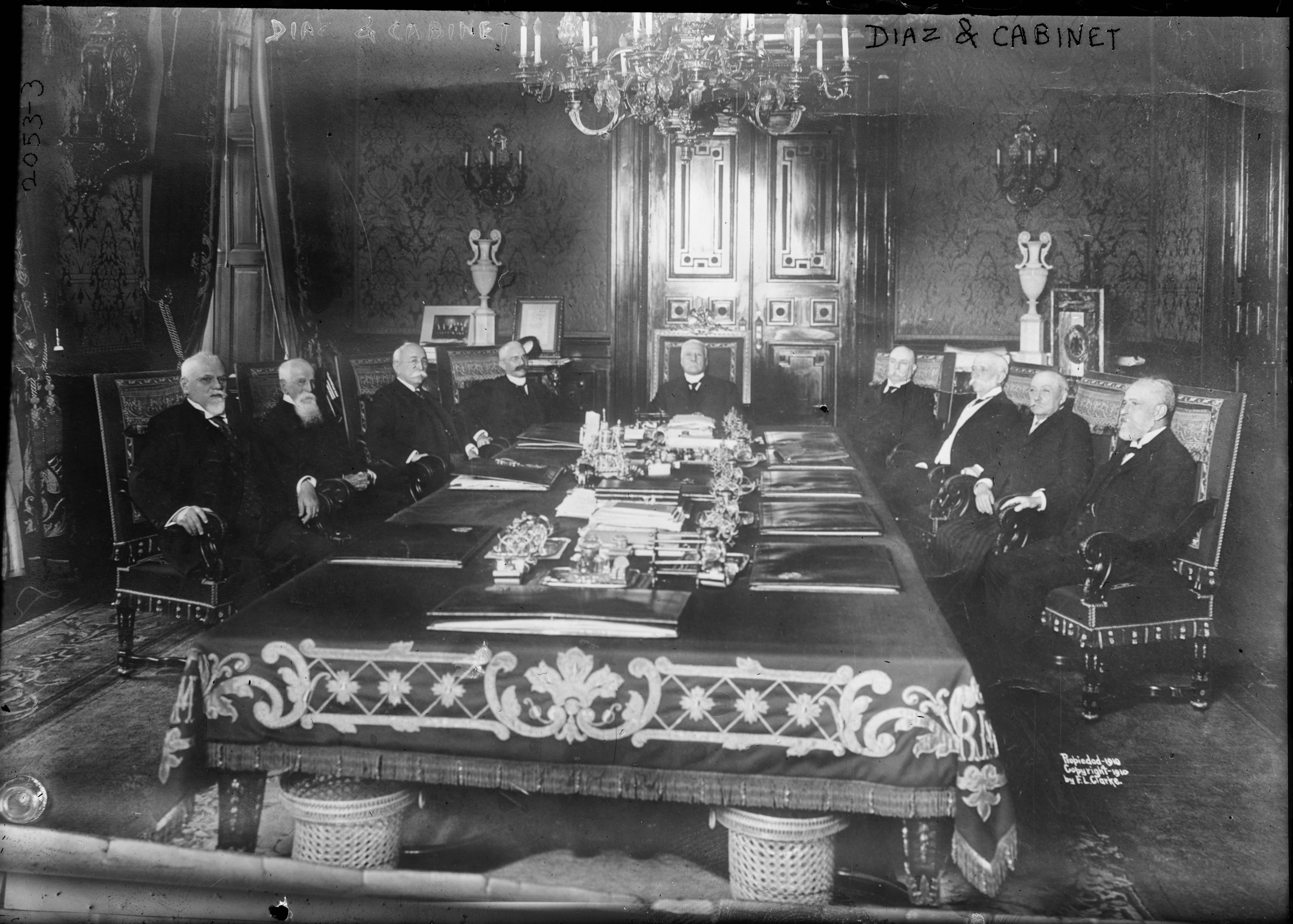
President Porfirio Díaz (center) and the Científicos. Creel is the fourth from the right.

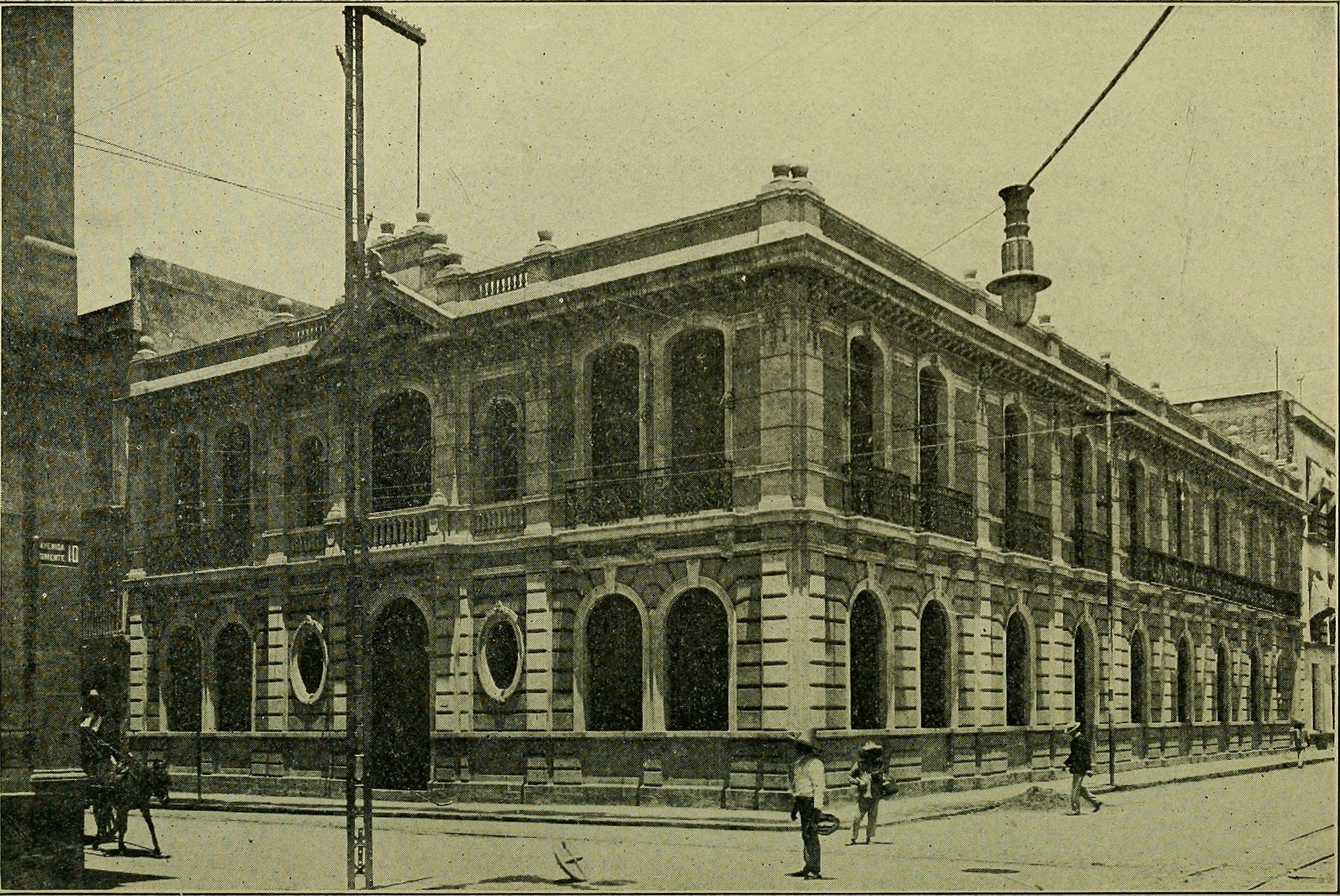
Building of the Banco Central Mexicano in Mexico City

Creel was born on 30 August 1850 in Ciudad Chihuahua, Chihuahua. He was the son of Paz Cuilty Bustamante, a Mexican woman, and Reuben W. Creel, an American of English descent. Reuben was a native of Greensburg, Kentucky, and immigrated to Mexico in 1845. He was an interpreter for the American army during the Mexican–American War, and remained in Mexico after the war ended. Reuben also served as Abraham Lincoln's US Consul in Chihuahua from 1863 to 1866. Paz Cuilty was the daughter of a wealthy landowner, and her sister Carolina Cuilty Bustamante de Terrazas was the wife of the general and Chihuahuan politician Luis Terrazas. Enrique Creel's paternal grandparents were Eligel and Melinda Creel, and his maternal grandparents were Gabino Cuilty and María de la Luz Bustamante. Enrique had nine siblings: Beatriz, Carolina, Carlos, Juan, Rubén, Ermine, María and Paz.

Enrique Creel married Angela Terrazas, the daughter of Luis Terrazas, in 1880, making him a son-in-law of Luis Terrazas

After Porfirio Díaz became president of Mexico in 1876, he appointed Creel as a director of the National Board of Dynamite and Explosives. Mexico's demand for explosives was high because of its mining and railroad industries and the army's need for munitions. The board imposed an 80% import duty on dynamite, allowing its members to manufacture explosives without competition and reportedly enabling Creel to amass an even larger fortune in kickbacks.

In 1898, he founded the Banco Central Mexicano (of which he became president) alongside other members of the Científicos.

In 1904, Luis Terrazas was elected to serve as the governor of Chihuahua, but several months in he stepped down "for a rest". This led to Creel becoming the interim governor. In late 1906, Díaz appointed Creel to serve as Mexico's ambassador to the United States. As Creel would now be occupying a federal position and Terrazas appeared to have permanently retired, hopes for an election in which the public could directly select a candidate increased. However, in March 1907, the pro-Creel newspaper El Norte proposed that Creel be a candidate. He ultimately won the election.

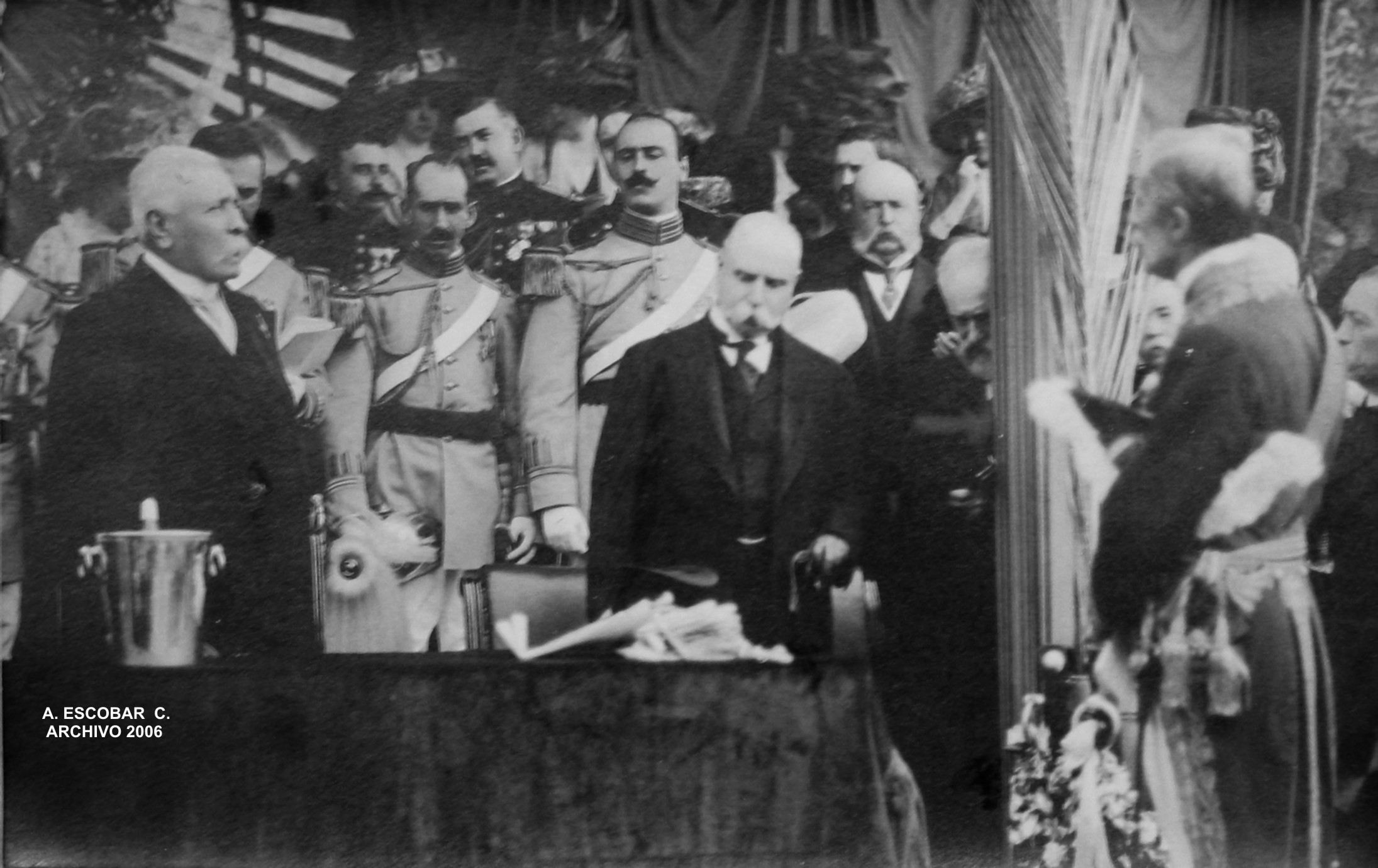
President Porfirio Díaz and Minister Enrique C. Creel during the celebrations of the first centennial of Mexican Independence in 1910.

Enrique Creel served as Mexico's Minister of Foreign Relations and as its Ambassador to the United States. The bilingual Creel served as interpreter when presidents Porfirio Díaz and William Howard Taft met in 1909 on the international bridge between Ciudad Juárez and El Paso. He became vice-president of the Kansas City, Mexico and Orient Railway, where he was responsible for the construction of part of the railroad west of Chihuahua, now the Chihuahua Pacific Railroad (Ferrocarril Chihuahua al Pacífico) which runs through the town of Creel, Chihuahua. He was a key intermediary between the Mexican government and foreign companies, serving on their boards, as well as helping arrange "government subsidies and tax abatements and financial support for foreign firms." His haciendas once totaled more than 1.7 million acres (6,900 km^{2}). Creel was one of Díaz's advisers who had urged the president to be interviewed by James Creelman of Pearson's Magazine, in which Díaz declared he would not be a candidate for president in 1910.

The Mexican Revolution forced him to abandon Mexico for the United States and he had major financial losses due to the Revolution, with revolutionaries expropriating his landed estates. He returned after the end of the revolution, and served for a period in the administration of northern revolutionary general Alvaro Obregón (1920–24). He died in Mexico City on 18 August 1931.

== Publications ==
- Los bancos de México (English: The Banks of Mexico)
- Importación y exportación (Imports and Exports)
- Agricultura y agrarismo (Agriculture and Agrarianism)

== See also ==
- Creel-Terrazas Family, a powerful and wealthy family from Chihuahua founded by Luis Terrazas, his father-in-law.
