= Creal =

Creal may refer to:

- A philosophical concept developed by Luis de Miranda
- CREAL (Center for Research on Educational Access and Leadership), a Think tank
- C-REAL, a South Korean girl group
- C:Real, a Greek pop rock band

== People ==
- C-Real (rapper) (born 1984), Ghanaian entertainer
- Cecil Creal (1899–1986), mayor of Ann Arbor, Michigan
- Edward W. Creal (1883–1943), US Representative from Kentucky
- Rose Ann Creal (1865–1921), Australian WWI army nurse

== See also ==
- Creel (disambiguation)
