= Santiago Creel =

Mexican politician

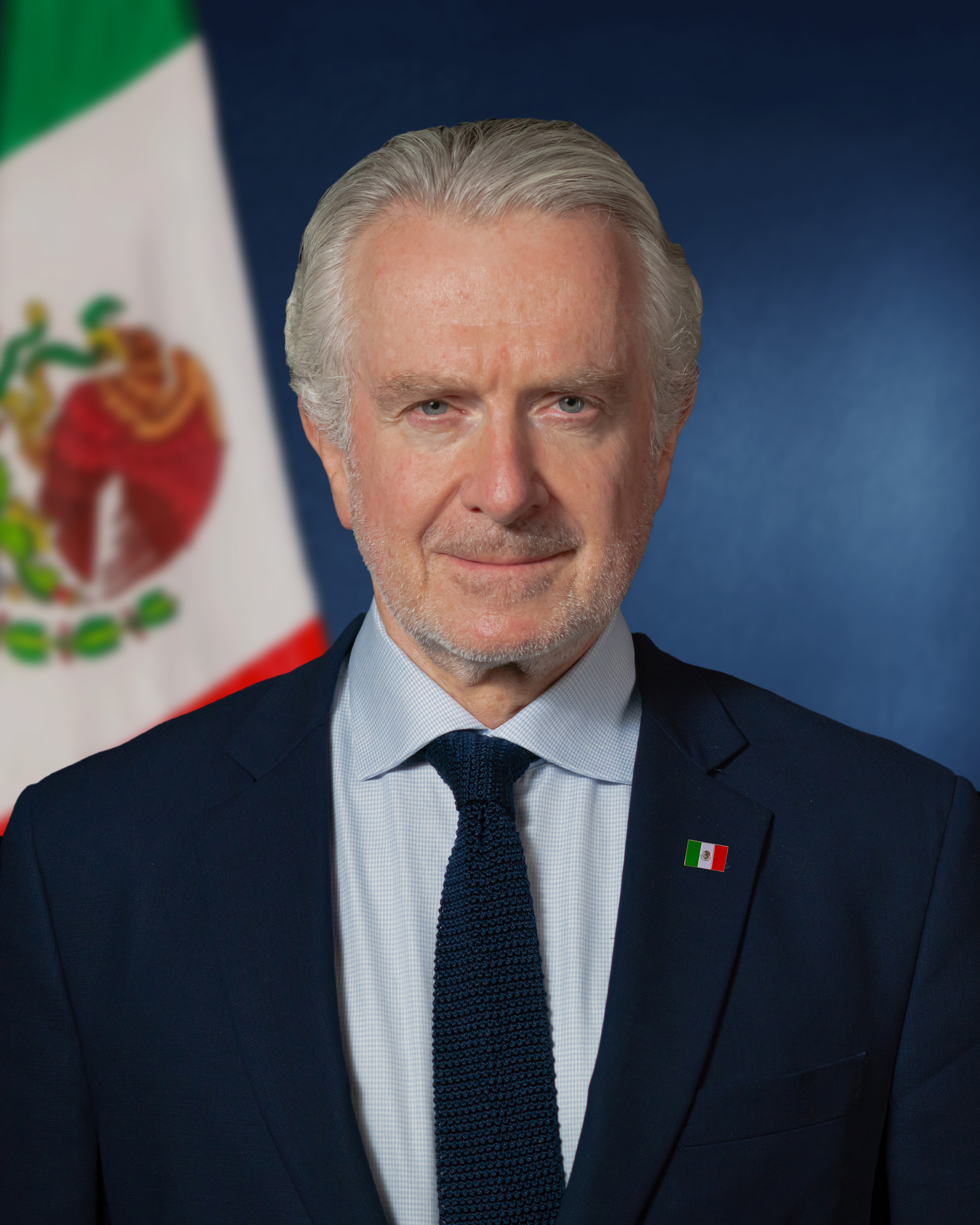
- Creel in 2022

President of the Chamber of Deputies of Mexico
- In office 1 September 2022 – 14 August 2023
- Preceded by: Sergio Gutiérrez Luna
- Succeeded by: Marcela Guerra Castillo (Note: Following Creel's leave of absence from the Chamber of Deputies, Noemí Luna Ayala served as acting president beginning on 14 August 2023. She remained in the role until the next legislative session, when Marcela Guerra Castillo was elected president.)

President of the Senate of Mexico
- In office 1 September 2007 – 31 August 2008
- Preceded by: Manlio Fabio Beltrones
- Succeeded by: Gustavo Madero Muñoz

Secretary of the Interior of Mexico
- In office 1 December 2000 – 1 June 2005
- President: Vicente Fox
- Preceded by: Diódoro Carrasco
- Succeeded by: Carlos Abascal

Personal details
- Born: Santiago Creel Miranda; 11 December 1954 (age 71) Mexico City, Mexico
- Party: National Action Party
- Spouse: Paulina Velasco (m. 2010)
- Relations: Creel-Terrazas Family
- Children: 6
- Relatives: Lola Creel (sister); Jose de Teresa (granduncle)
- Education: Georgetown; UNAM; University of Michigan
- Profession: Lawyer; Politician

Santiago Creel Miranda (Spanish pronunciation: [sanˈtjaɣo kɾil miˈɾanda]; born on 11 December 1954) is a Mexican lawyer and politician, and a member of the National Action Party (PAN). Since 1 September 2021, he had used to be a federal deputy and the current president of the Congress of the Union and of the board of directors of the Chamber of Deputies. However, Creel resigned from his position as president of the Chamber of Deputies on August 14, 2023, to pursue the presidential nomination for the 2024 elections. As of March 2026, the current President of the Chamber of Deputies is Kenia López Rabadán, who was appointed on 2 September 2025.

He served as Secretary of the Interior during the presidency of Vicente Fox Quesada, from 2000 to 2005. In 2006, he was elected senator to the Congress of the Union and served as President of the Senate of the Republic from 2007 to 2008. In 2016 he served as Constituent Deputy of Mexico City.

== Background and family life ==
Creel's campaign information describes him as a lawyer, father, and husband, as well as a Party loyalist. Born to an American father of Mexican, English, Irish and Spanish descent, and a French mother of German, German Jewish (as Creel's matrilineal lineage is Jewish, he should be considered to be a Jew by Jewish law), Spanish and Mexican ancestry, he is a descendant of the Creel-Terrazas family via his father René Creel (1921–2009) who was one of the founders of the National Action Party. Creel has a long history with the PAN. In 2008, he admitted that he is the father of actress Edith González's daughter, Constanza.

=== Ancestry ===
Ancestors of Santiago Creel

8. (Mexico) Enrique Creel Cuilty (Chihuahua, 1854–1931)
4. (Mexico) Luis Creel-Terrazas (Chihuahua, 1884–)
9. (Mexico) Ángela Terrazas Cuilty
2. (United States) René Jorge Creel (Los Angeles, 1921–Mexico City, 2009)
10. (Mexico) José Ramón Remigio Luján Estavillo (Chihuahua), 1832–?)
5. (Mexico) Teresa Luján Zuloaga
11. (Mexico) Francisca Zuloaga Álvarez
1. Santiago Creel (Mexico City, 1954)
12. (Mexico) Salvador Miranda Marrón (Puebla)
6. (Mexico) José Salvador Miranda de Teresa (1902–1983)
13. (Mexico) María de la Paz de Teresa y Miranda (sister of José de Teresa y Miranda)
3. (France) Dolores Miranda Saalfeld (Paris, 1931–2014)
14. (Germany) Charles Saalfeld
7. (France) Margherite Berthe Saalfeld (Paris, 1905–Neuilly-sur-Seine, 1989)
15. (Germany) Betty Durlacher (Kippenheim, 1876–Paris, 1925)

== Education ==
Creel received a bachelor's degree in law from the National Autonomous University of Mexico (UNAM) and subsequently completed graduate studies at Georgetown University and earned a master's degree at the University of Michigan.

== Political career ==
His career highlights include running for Head of Government of the Federal District in 2000 (a race he narrowly lost to Andrés Manuel López Obrador). He was later appointed to the cabinet by President Vicente Fox to serve as Secretary of the Interior, a position he held from December 2000 to June 2005.

On 1 June 2005, Creel presented Fox with his resignation in order to seek his party's candidacy for the 2006 presidential election. Creel's main contender for the PAN's candidacy was Felipe Calderón who won the primary elections and went on to become President of Mexico.

His ministry issued gaming permits to seven companies for 286 casinos. One of them, signed days before he resigned, went to Televisa and became the PlayCity Casino chain. There were accusations of a deal with Televisa's main shareholders for more airtime for his campaign. In June 2005 an internal audit ordered by his successor, Carlos Abascal, concluded the Televisa permit had been issued in line with the rules, and the PAN cleared Creel the same week.

In 2006, Creel received a proportional representation seat in the Senate to serve during the 60th and 61st Legislatures (2006–2012) and led the PAN Senate delegation until June 2008.

== 2012 PAN presidential primary ==
Santiago Creel decided to run for the PAN's Presidential Nomination for the 2012 election and initially led polls ahead of the other candidates on the basis of his high profile, but subsequently lost the nomination to Josefina Vazquez Mota.

== Constituent Assembly of Mexico City ==
Creel was one of seven PAN representatives elected by the voters of Mexico City to sit on the Constituent Assembly of Mexico City, which convened on 15 September 2016.

== Notes ==
Political offices
Preceded by Diódoro Carrasco	Secretary of the Interior; 2000—2005	Succeeded by Carlos Abascal
