= Revolución de los Ríos =

1867–1868 indigenous uprising in Mexico

- Part of the Yaqui Wars, Mexican Indian Wars
| Date | 1867–1868 |
| Location | Sonora, Mexico |
| Result | Mexican victory, Yaquis and Mayo retreat. |

Belligerents
| Mexico | Yaqui; Mayo |

Commanders and leaders
| (Mexico) Ignacio Pesqueira (Mexico) Prospero Bustamante | Unknown |

The Revolución de los Ríos (Revolution of the Rivers) refers to an uprising lasting from 1867 to 1868 by the Mayo and the Yaqui people who lived along the Mayo and the Yaqui Rivers in Sonora, against the government of Mexico.

The uprising began during the collapse of the Second Mexican Empire as Mexican Republican rule was being reestablished in Sonora. The government repeatedly defeated the Yaqui and the Mayos, but they kept regrouping and renewing the war. The conflict eventually resulted in a massacre when Mexican troops gathered over 400 Yaqui men, women, and children into a church at Bacum and then began firing upon it, leaving up to 120 civilians dead. The uprising did not end until flooding at the end of 1868 along the Mayo and Yaqui rivers left the Indigenous communities too devastated to continue waging warfare.

== Background ==
During the Second French Intervention in Mexico, the long-standing abuses of the Mexican government motivated members of the Indigenous tribes of Sonora to join the French in setting up the Second Mexican Empire. The French gained allies among the Yaqui, the Mayo, and the Opata. Refugio Tánori, chief of the Opatas joining the Empire at Guaymas with a large band. The Yaqui leader Mateo Marquin publicly expressed support for the French. These native allies of the French took control of Álamos, Sonora, and drove the Mexican Republican commander Ignacio Pesqueira from his base at Ures.

As the Empire fell, Tánori was captured with several other Imperialist officials and executed by Republican forces. The commander of those executions, Prospero Salazar Bustamante, would later carry out the Bacum Massacre at the end of the Revolucion de los Rios.

== Start of the Conflict ==
Towards the end of the Second Mexican Empire, after republican control had been reestablished in Sonora, there had been a Yaqui uprising in June 1867. On 1 July, the prefect of Guaymas, Colonel Prospero Salazar Bustamante, headed towards the scene with a few volunteer forces of the national guard, which he had gathered at Guaymas. The Yaqui were pacified only to rise up again towards the end of the year. The Mayo Indians had also rebelled and the Prefect of Álamos. Jose Prado viewed the necessity of carrying out a military campaign.

The Yaqui rebels managed to kill one of the Mexican military commander sent to keep them under control, and the Yaqui went as far as the Rio Mayo by December. They attacked and defeated the garrison that was at Santa Cruz, and passed on to the towns of Etchojoa and San Pedro. The commander of the national guard Alejo Toledo united forces at Navojoa, and shortly after the Prefect of Álamos, Jose Prado marched towards Mayo to face the insurgents.

Governor Pesqueira placed his base of operations at Guaymas, and from there dispatched Colonel Salazar Bustamante with 300 men from Guaymas, 200 from Hermosillo and 4 pieces of artillery. Prefect Prado was sent with 400 men to subdue the Mayo and at San Marcial and Buenavista were placed other small forces to keep tabs on the insurgents. Colonel Salazar Bustamante established himself at El Medano close to the mouth of the river, from there he sent expeditionary forces against the Indians, along with the Indian ally Dionisio Salazar. Governor Pesqueira also decreed that after rounding the rebel leaders the authorities were to ‘distribute the rest to all the pueblos, haciendas, and ranchos of the state in order to convert them into useful men for industry and particularly and most especially for agriculture and mining, which need so much of their labor.”

Prefect Prado defeated the Mayo and then sent his forces against the remaining rebel Yaquis, defeating on 8 January 1868, the insurgents at San Jose and on January 10, at Bacum. On 13 January, his forces met those of Colonel Bustamante.

These operations were being conducted from Guaymas by the military commander of the region General Garcia Morales who ordered the forces stationed at Alamos to return to the Guaymas military district in order to maintain peace among the Mayo. This proved to be prescient as the Mayo rose up once again before the end of January. On 13 February, they attacked the port of Agiabampo and carried off supplies belonging to local merchants. They were later however defeated by Colonel Prado, Lieutenant Colonel Nazario Moreno, and Commander Alejo Toledo.

The Yaqui campaigns continued to be active through early 1868. Government forces patrolled the river defeating any Yaqui forces that they were able to reach, obliging Indigenous inhabitants of those parts to seek refuge in the forests. Men were shot by firing squad, women and children were taken into custody and their belongings were seized under the pretext that they had been stolen.

== The Bacum Massacre ==
On February 12, a force led by colonel Bustamante defeated near Cócorit a party of Indians, leaving 33 men dead and taking an equal amount of prisoners. Three days later a party of 600 Yaqui including women and children appeared at the same town seeking to surrender, and Colonel Salazar suspecting an act of perfidy took them prisoner, and announced he would release a prisoner for every firearm turned in. After 48 were turned in, Bustamante then released 48 prisoners and with over 400 prisoners remaining marched on February 18 towards the town of Bacum, in whose church he locked up the prisoners including women and children, taking ten of the leaders as hostages and assuring the prisoners that he would have the leaders shot at the least attempt by any of the prisoners to escape. The hostages were shot at half past nine in the evening on the pretext of having detected an escape attempt. The troops then opened fire upon the church. A cannon was placed at the very door, and shrapnel was fired into the church multiple times. The church caught on fire, and seventy Yaqui perished, the rest having escaped amidst the disorder.

The government considered the rebellion to be over by May, 1868, and commander Garcia Morales ordered the remaining troops in the vicinity to retreat in June. The Mayos attacked the town of Etchojoa on 5 July, and 400 Mayos then headed towards Santa Cruz. Lieutenant Colonel Jose Otero left Álamos with a force from the National Guard to combat this new insurrection, which did not end until October when large floods on the Rio Mayo devastated the Indian communities, leaving them unable to wage further warfare.
