= Walton Creel =

American artist

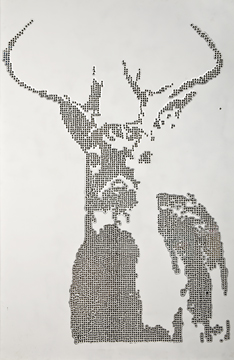
Walton Creel, Deer, 2003, .22 caliber bullets through white painted aluminum, 72x48 inches.

Walton Hardy Creel (born November 12, 1974), also known as Walt Creel, is an American artist who lives and works in Birmingham, Alabama. Creel is best known for his series Deweaponizing the Gun, which focuses on firearms.

== His Art ==
Deweaponizing the Gun is a series of large scale "drawings" created by shooting complicated patterns through 6x4' white painted sheets of aluminum with a .22 caliber rifle given to him by his father as a present. The images used in this series are of southern wildlife and include: Deer, Owl, Bunny, Opossum, Squirrel, and Wren. When asked how others view his work Creel states, "Whatever view a person already holds on guns is the view they project onto me. If they love guns and think gun ownership is a God-given right, then they see my work as reinforcement of that view. If they think guns should be banned, they see my work as an ironic protest."

In 2008 Creel recorded an audio companion for Deweaponizing the Gun, Shooting / Loading. It was released as a limited edition vinyl record and documented the sounds of his creative processes in the field.

== Awards and honors ==
- 2009 Resident Artist, Coleman Center for the Arts, York, Alabama.
- 2008 Emerging Artist, Magic City Art Connection, Birmingham, Alabama.
