= Creel-Terrazas family =

Mexican political family

Creel-Terrazas
- Current region: Chihuahua
- Origin: Chihuahua, Mexico
- Founded: 19th century
- Founder: Luis Terrazas

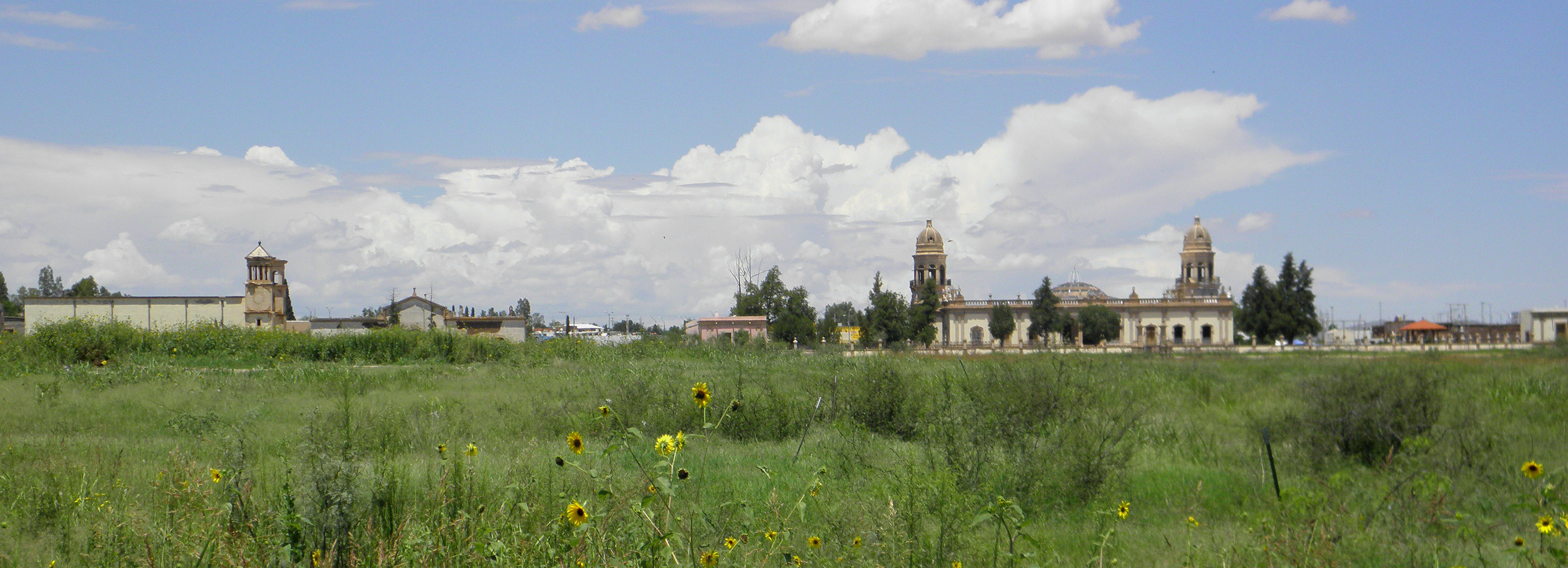
The Quinta Carolina in Chihuahua, looking north.

The Creel-Terrazas family is a powerful and wealthy Mexican political family from the Mexican state of Chihuahua.

== History ==
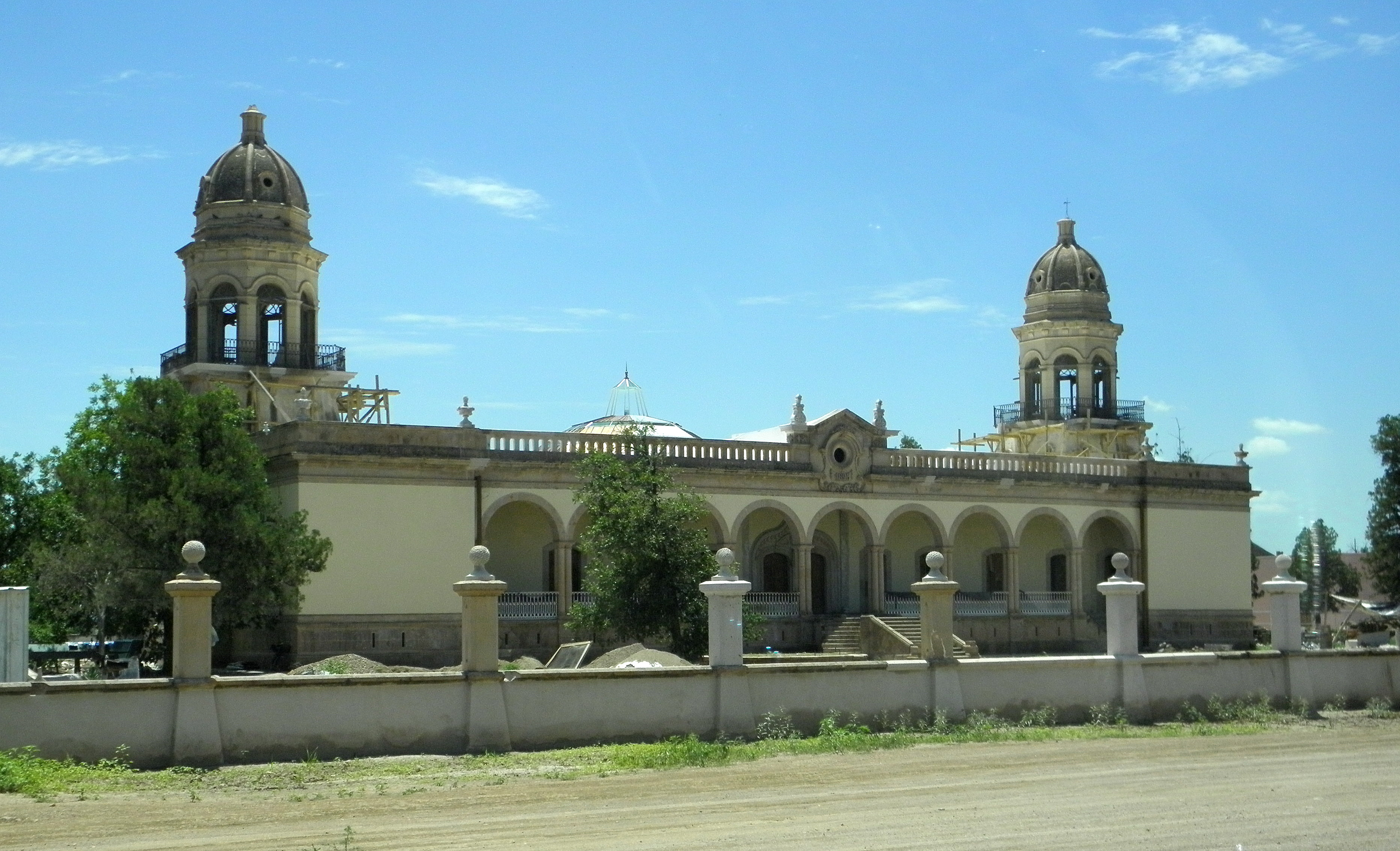
Quinta Carolina: the Main House.

During the rule of President Porfirio Díaz and the Mexican Revolution, this family was part of the científico faction. The científicos were conservative civilian technocrats and advisors of President Díaz. The family was poised to succeed Díaz in power, but it was largely discredited because of the economic decline at the time before the outbreak of the Revolution.

By the early 20th century, the family controlled 50 haciendas and ranches throughout the state with a total extension in excess of 8 million acres (28,000 km^{2}), although some sources estimate their holdings at 15 million acres. They owned more than 1 million head of cattle, 225,000 sheep, 250,000 horses and 50,000 mules. Encinillas, north of the state capital of Chihuahua, was the largest hacienda occupying an area of 1,300,000 acres (5,300 km^{2}). It employed some 2,000 peons.

The wealth of the family is evident by simply examining the various properties in the city of Chihuahua that were owned by the clan at the outbreak of the revolution in 1910: the Casa Creel on Aldama, the Residencia Terrazas at the corner of Colón and Juárez and, formerly, the gem of the collection, the Quinta Carolina in Colonia Nombre de Dios in the north of the city. This last was the summer estate of Don Luis Terrazas and his family. Though now in a semi-ruined state, the governments of the city and state of Chihuahua are beginning an extensive rehabilitation and restoration of the property. The estate was completely outside the city at the time, and where there are now houses, once only ranchland, cultivated farmland and gardens surrounded the estate house, chapel and outbuildings.

== Media ==
A book by Mark Wasserman discusses the family's "efforts to maintain its power after the Revolution, including its use of economic resources and intermarriage to forge partnerships with the new, revolutionary elite."^{1}

After the Revolution, the Creel-Terrazas family extended to include other families that immigrated from Chile, Argentina, and Poland.

== Family ==
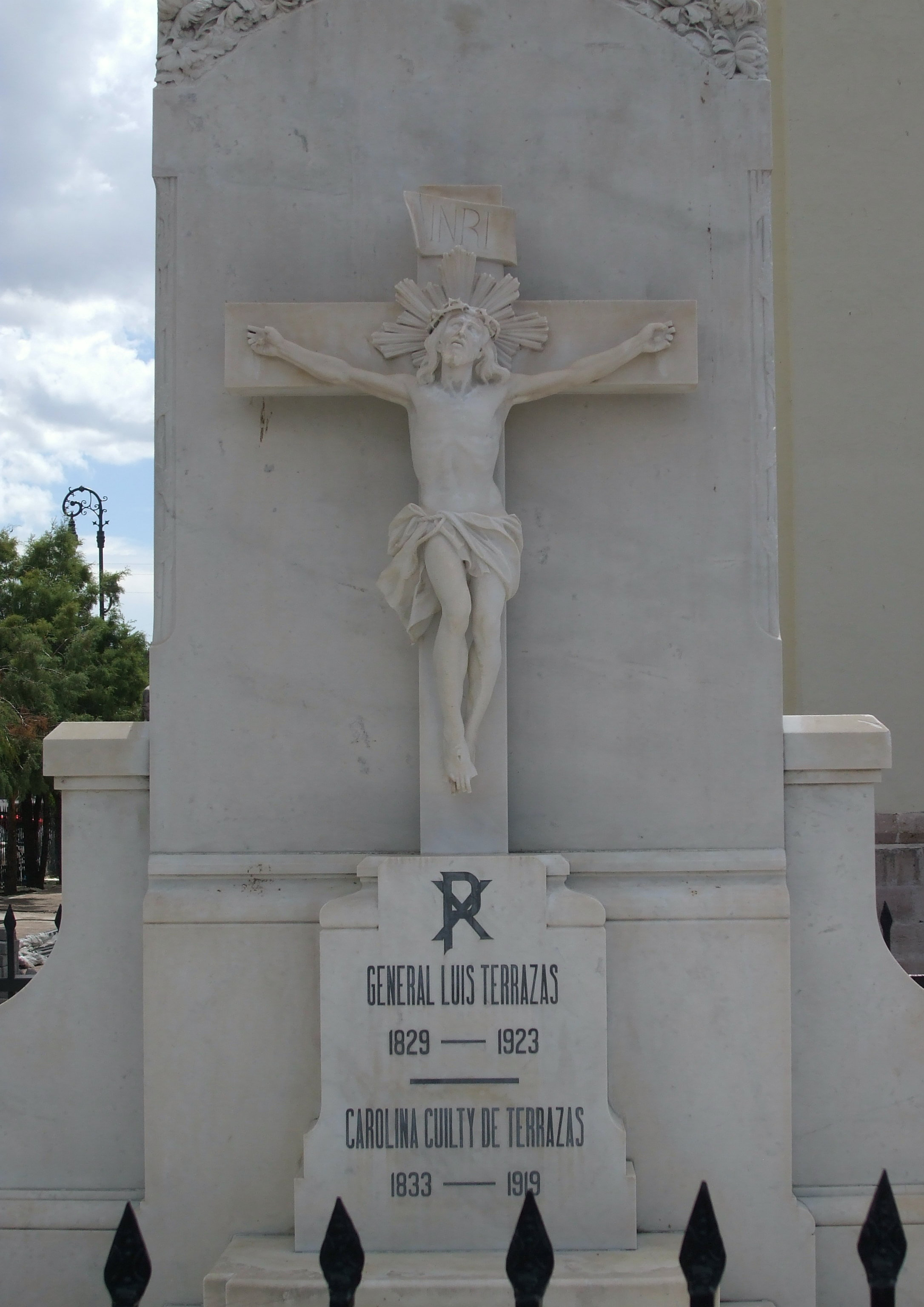
Tomb of Don Luis Terrazas and his wife, Carolina Cuilty de Terrazas, in Chihuahua.

Some noteworthy members of the family are:

- Don Luis Terrazas (1829–1923), founder of the clan. Elected Governor of Chihuahua in 1860, host, political ally and confidant of President Benito Juárez during the French Intervention. His ranches once totaled more than 7 million acres (28,000 km^{2}). When asked once at a social function if he were from Chihuahua, he was reported to have replied, "No soy de Chihuahua; Chihuahua es mío" ("I'm not from Chihuahua; Chihuahua is mine"). Said to have faced-down his enemy Pancho Villa in a confrontation during the early days of the Revolution; he and Villa died in the same year (Terrazas from old age; Villa by assassination). Served as governor for various terms of office between 1860 and 1904.
- Enrique Creel (1854–1931), Porfirian Governor of Chihuahua from 1904 to 1906 and again from 1907 to 1911. He was the son of Reuben Creel, once the US Consul in Chihuahua, and became son-in-law of Don Luis Terrazas by virtue of marriage to his daughter (Reuben Creel and Luis Terrazas were married to sisters of the wealthy Cuilty family whose ancestry was Irish and was related to Sir Thomas More). Enrique Creel served as Mexico's Minister of Foreign Relations and as its Ambassador to the United States. He served as interpreter when Presidents Porfirio Díaz and William Howard Taft met in 1909 on the international bridge between Ciudad Juárez and El Paso. He became vice-president of the Kansas City, Mexico and Orient Railway, where he was responsible for the construction of part of the railroad west of the city of Chihuahua. His haciendas totalled 1.7 million acres (6,900 km^{2}).
- Don Silvestre Terrazas (1873–1944), a distant cousin of Luis Terrazas, publisher of the newspaper El Correo de Chihuahua (The Chihuahua Mail), political nemesis of Enrique Creel, and revolutionary Governor of Chihuahua, serving two terms of office. More information is available at: .
- Juan Terrazas Cuilty (1852–1925), a son of Luis Terrazas and Carolina Cuilty (1833–1919), businessman and industrialist. He established powerful financial interests in Monterrey companies that are today Vitro, S.A. and Cemex. His descendants still enjoy considerable interests in these prominent Mexican companies.
- Gustavo Madero Muñoz (born 1955), a great-grandson of Juan Terrazas Cuilty, is former president of PAN (National Action Party) one of the most powerful parties in Mexico.
- Álvaro Madero Muñoz (born 1964), a great-grandson of Juan Terrazas Cuilty, is a Chihuahua businessman, president of Grupo Hema, a conglomerate made up of different business units including distribution of construction, agricultural and mining machinery, real estate, distribution of oils and lubricants and restaurant industry. He was mayor of the city of Chihuahua in 2010.
- Alberto Terrazas Cuilty (1869–1926), a son of Luis Terrazas and Carolina Cuilty, served as Governor of Chihuahua from 1910 to 1911. Industrialist, businessman, banker and appointed colonel in the army by Gen. Victoriano Huerta, he fought against Villa and remained in Chihuahua until 1914 when he was badly wounded in the Revolution, then moved to El Paso, TX.^{2}
- Santiago Creel Miranda was the Minister of the Interior (Secretario de Gobernación) of Mexico from 2000 to 2005, representing the conservative PAN party. On June 1, 2005, he presented his resignation to President Vicente Fox to (unsuccessfully) seek his party's presidential nomination. He is a leading figure in the Mexican Senate.
- Federico Terrazas Torres is the chairman of Grupo Cementos de Chihuahua (GCC), one of the largest concrete makers/distributors in Mexico with subsidiaries in the United States (GCC also has four other members of the family on its board of directors). Member of the board of various other Mexican companies, he is also the President of Directory Advisory Board of Higher Education of Chihuahua, Misiones Coloniales de Chihuahua, A.C., Promotora Cultural de Chihuahua, A.C., and Promotora de la Cultura Mexicana, A.C. Terrazas is a graduate of the Instituto Tecnologico de Monterrey (ITESM) with a degree in Public Accounting.
- Enrique Terrazas Torres, a brother of Federico, is president of Grupo Ruba and Copachisa and a director of various other Mexican enterprises, including Cementos de Chihuahua, and the former Director of the state Economic Development Department . He holds degrees in Civil Engineering from the University of Michigan in Ann Arbor and Cornell University.
- Jaime Creel Sisniega is president and chairman of the board of Intermex Industrial Parks, one of the largest firms of its kind in the Republic.
- Aurelio Major is a poet, translator and editor. He was editorial director of Octavio Paz's Editorial Vuelta, and of Tusquets Editores, among other publishers in Mexico and Barcelona, and is currently co-founding editor of the Spanish language edition of Granta magazine and editorial consultant for several European publishing groups. He has translated the work of George Oppen, Michael Hamburger, Charles Tomlinson, and as of late, Basil Bunting (Lumen, Barcelona, 2004), among other poets and essayists. His edition, with an introduction, to Edmund Wilson's Selected Writings was published in 2008 (Lumen, Barcelona). He is also the Spanish translator of Susan Sontag's work since 2002. He is grandson of Genoveva Terrazas Falomir.

Members of the Creel-Terrazas extended family have served for a total of 67 terms in Chihuahua's state legislature, and 23 terms in the Congress of Mexico.

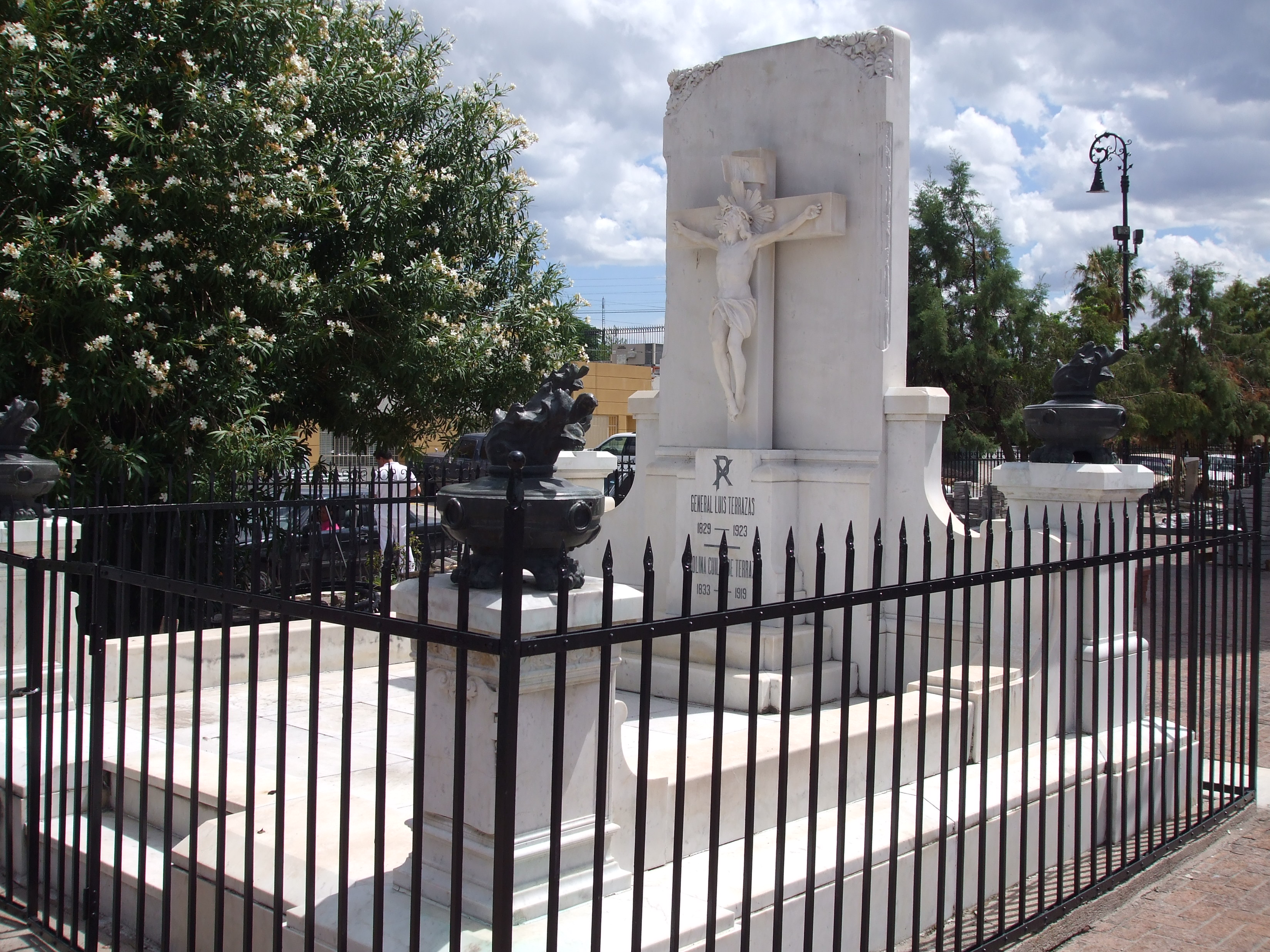
Another view of Terrazas tomb in the churchyard of the Santuario de Guadalupe, Chihuahua.

== See also ==
- Mexican Revolution
- Chihuahua City
- https://web.archive.org/web/20080608153449/http://omega.ilce.edu.mx:3000/sites/estados/libros/chihua/html/sec_36.html (Regarding history of the clan in early 20th century. Site in Spanish)
- http://content.cdlib.org/view?docId=tf2q2n99qr&chunk.id=bioghist-1.3.5&query=BANC%20MSS%20M-B%2018&brand=oac (A biography of Silvestre Terrazas. Site in English)
