= Guillermo Ruiz de Teresa =

Mexican politician

- Born: 30 June 1953 (age 72); Mexico City, Mexico
- Occupation: Politician
- Political party: PRI

Guillermo Raúl Ruiz de Teresa (born 30 June 1953) is a Mexican politician from the Institutional Revolutionary Party. From 2010 to 2012 he served as Deputy of the LXI Legislature of the Mexican Congress representing Guanajuato.
