= Francisco Bulnes =

Mexican politician

Francisco Bulnes (4 October 1847 – 22 September 1924) was a Mexican scientist, journalist, and politician who figured among the Científicos, the Mexican intelligentsia who supported the authoritarian presidency of Porfirio Díaz. He was a critic of the Mexican Revolution.

== Biography ==
Bulnes was born in Mexico City in 1847 and attended the National Mining School. He then taught mathematics at the prestigious National Preparatory School, later also teaching other sciences as well as political economy. As a member of Mexico's Society of Geography and Statistics, Bulnes traveled to Japan with a delegation of Mexican scientists. He entered political life through his work on the Mexico City-Veracruz railway line when he met liberal Veracruz politician Sebastian Lerdo de Tejada. Bulnes became a long-serving Mexican senator, where he drafted the first Bank Law and the Mining Code of 1880.

He was an admirer of the British political system and admired the progress of both the United Kingdom and the United States. He was a full supporter of liberal ideology which in Mexico sought to curtail the political and economic power of the Roman Catholic Church. Its religious doctrines stressed rewards in the afterlife and in liberals' view was an impediment to personal advancement and national economic development. He viewed Protestantism as "more suited to modern cultures."

In El porvenir de las nations Hispano-Americanas (The Future of the Hispanic-American Nations), published in 1899 in the wake of the Spanish–American War, Bulnes attributed Mexico's backwardness to a combination of Iberian conservatism and Indian debility. He explained the natives' weakness, using the recently developed science of nutrition, by dividing mankind into three races: the people of corn, wheat, and rice. After some dubious calculations of the nutritional value of staple grains, he concluded that “the race of wheat is the only truly progressive one,” and that “maize has been the eternal pacifier of America's indigenous races and the foundation of their refusal to become civilized.”

Bulnes attacked the reputation of the late president Benito Juárez, describing him "as an insignificant provincial lawyer with no clear ideology until he met Ocampo in New Orleans." Bulnes's attack on Juárez was contested by among others Genaro García and Justo Sierra.

In 1910 when the Mexican Revolution (1910–1920) erupted and the Díaz regime collapsed, Bulnes left Mexico for exile in New Orleans and then Havana, returning to Mexico in 1921 following the end of the military phase of the Revolution. Bulnes published a defense of Díaz in 1920 and a critique of U.S. President Woodrow Wilson's role in the Revolution.

As a staunch defender of the Díaz regime and one who espoused politically charged opinions on a variety of topics, Bulnes's reputation in Mexico has suffered. Manuel Gamio, the archaeologist who excavated the pyramids of Teotihuacán, denounced Bulnes as a racist, while Daniel Cosio Villegas, a leading historian, described him as “one of the most evasive, designing, and deceitful writers that Mexico has ever produced.” However, historian of Mexican liberalism, Charles A. Hale says "His critical insights have attracted many modern scholars to his work."

== Works ==
- Sobre el hemisferio norte, once mil leguas. Impressiones de viaje a Cuba, los Estados Unidos, el Japón, China, Cochinchina, Egipto y Europa. México: Imprenta de la Revista Universal (1875).
- El porvenir de las naciones latinoamericanas ante las recientes conquistas de Europa y Norteamérica. Estructura y evolución de un continente. México, (1899).
- El verdadero Juárez y la verdad sobre la intervención y el imperio, (1904).
- Las grandes mentiras de nuestra historia: la Nación y el Ejército en las guerras extranjeras, (1904).
- Juárez y la revoluciones de Ayutla y de Reforma (1906).
- The Whole Truth About Mexico: President Wilson's Responsibility. (New York: M. Bulnes Book Co., 1916)
- El verdadero Díaz y la Revolución, Editorial Gomez de la Puente, 1920.
- Los problemas de México (1926).
