= Luis Terrazas =

Mexican businessman and politician (1829–1923)

Governor of Chihuahua
- In office 1903–1904; 1883–1884; 1881–1882; 1879–1880

Personal details
- Born: José Luis Gonzaga Jesús Daniel Terrazas Fuentes; July 20, 1829 Chihuahua, Mexico
- Died: June 18, 1923 (aged 93) Chihuahua, Mexico

Luis Terrazas (20 July 1829 in Chihuahua, Mexico – 18 June 1923 in Chihuahua) was a Mexican politician, businessman, rancher, and soldier.

== Career ==
Terrazas was a pivotal figure in the history of the state of Chihuahua from the middle of the 19th century through the outbreak of the Mexican Revolution. He was a leader of the Cientificos during the regime of Porfirio Díaz and was the founder of the influential Creel-Terrazas family.

First elected Governor of Chihuahua in 1858, Terrazas was a host, political ally, and confidant of President Benito Juárez during the French Intervention, when Juarez was living with his cabinet in exile in Chihuahua City from 1864 through 1866. He served as governor for various terms of office between 1858 and 1904.

His ranches had once totalled more than seven million acres (28,000 km^{2}). He acquired his properties in a number of ways; one significant advantage was that, as governor of the state, Terrazas was able to move armed forces into and out of portions of the state, creating instability in prices and buy good rangeland where prices had decreased.

In 1902, he sold a ranch, Hacienda Humboldt at Julimes, near Delicias, Chihuahua, to a group of sponsors organized by President Theodore Roosevelt for a colony of South African Boer refugees. Roosevelt was represented by Edward Reeve Merritt and Marshall Latham Bond.

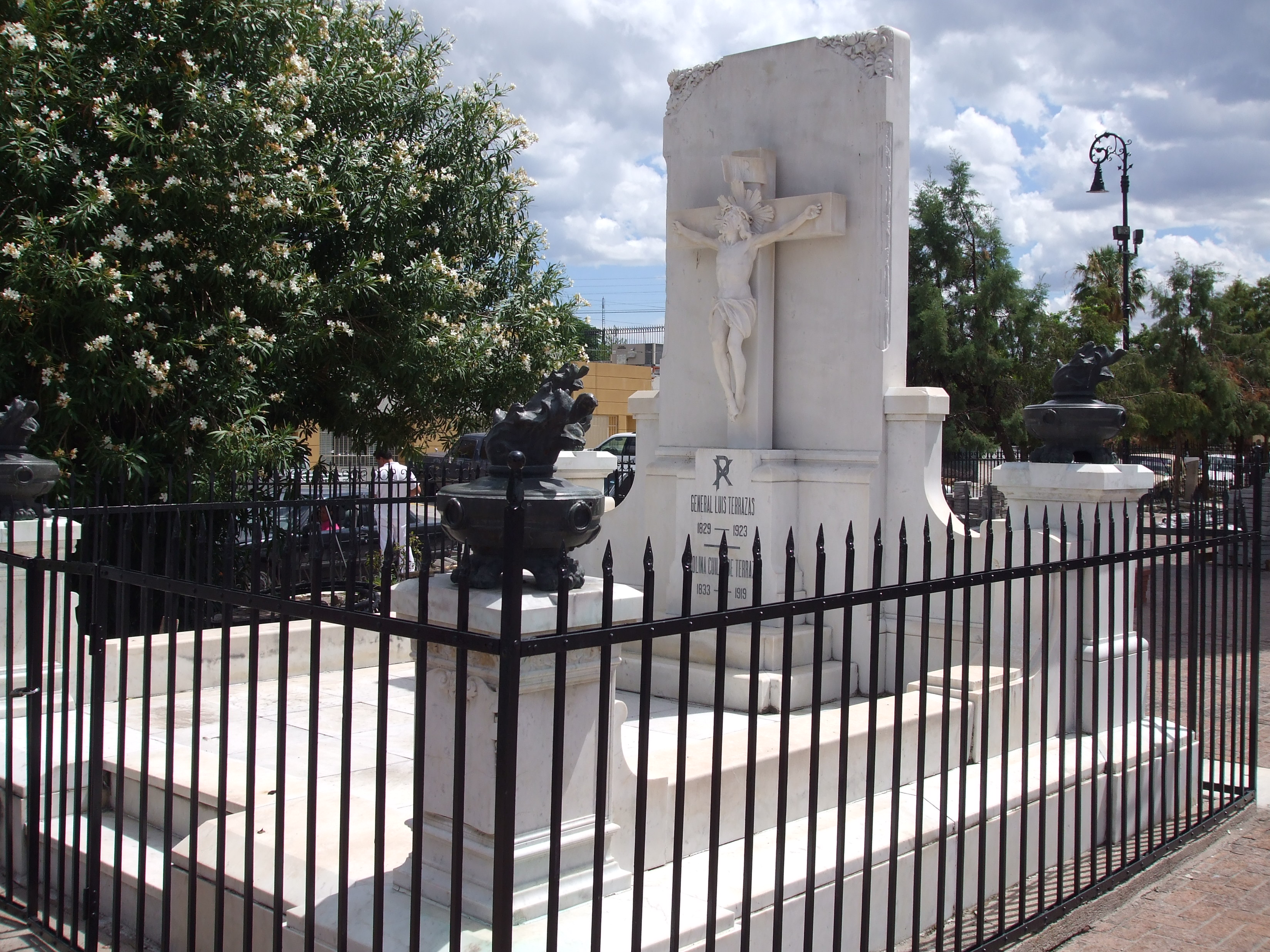
A view of Terrazas' tomb in the churchyard of the Santuario de Guadalupe, Chihuahua City.

Terrazas was said to have faced-down his enemy Pancho Villa in a confrontation during the early days of the Revolution; he had suspected Villa of rustling his cattle and refused to have any dealings with him, leading to a mutual enmity between the two. Villa was also the leading suspect in the abduction of Terrazas' eldest son, Luis, during the Revolution. He died in 1923.
