= KREO =

KREO may refer to:

- KREO (FM), a radio station (93.5 FM) licensed to serve James Town, Wyoming, United States
- KMGQ, a defunct radio station (105.3 FM) formerly licensed to serve Pine Bluffs, Wyoming, which held the call sign KREO from 2001 to 2014
- Rome State Airport (ICAO code KREO)
- Kre-O, a toy line from Hasbro
