= 1867 Mexican constitutional referendum =

A referendum on constitutional reform was held in Mexico on 22 September 1867. After the execution of the Emperor Maximilian, reinstated President Benito Juárez adopted a decree on 14 August 1867 that called for general elections and five constitutional reforms:

- Bicameral legislature (i.e., establishment of a senate)
- Veto of the President by Congress, requiring a 2/3 supermajority
- Substituting written notice by executive officers for a previous requirement of personal presence
- Limiting the powers of the Congress Committee when Congress is not in session
- To provide a method of succession for both President and Chief Justice

The referendum was held alongside general elections. The newly elected Congress opposed the growing power of the President and referred to articles 40 and 127 of the Constitution of 1857, which set up a purely representative system and gave only Congress the right to change the Constitution. In a compromise, Juárez was re-elected but the referendum results were not counted. Juárez said he had called the referendum only because of extraordinary circumstances, and the Congress was satisfied by a reprimand to the President.
