= Copachisa =

Copachisa Constructora
- Type: S.A. (corporation)
- Industry: Industrial Construction
- Founded: 1958
- Founder: Enrique Terrazas
- Headquarters: Chihuahua, Chihuahua, México
- Key people: Enrique Terrazas, Chairman of the board Guillermo Baca, General Manager
- Revenue: $xxx USD (2006)
- Number of employees: 517
- Website: Official website

Copachisa (Constructora de Parques de Chihuahua, S.A. de C.V.) is an industrial design and construction company based in the city of Chihuahua, Mexico, with regional offices in Monterrey, Ciudad Juárez, Querétaro, San Luis Potosí, and Mexico City.
