= Creels, West Virginia =

Unincorporated community in West Virginia, United States

Creels
- Unincorporated community
- Location within the state of West Virginia Creels (the United States)
- Coordinates: 39°11′48″N 81°30′1″W
- Country: United States
- State: West Virginia
- County: Wood
- Elevation: 640 ft (200 m)
- Time zone: UTC-5 (Eastern (EST))
  - Summer (DST): UTC-4 (EDT)
- GNIS ID: 1554219

Creels is an unincorporated community in Wood County, West Virginia, United States.

Wood County is in the Eastern Time Zone (UTC -5 hours).
