= Scientific politics =

Political theory based on the philosophy of Auguste Comte

Scientific politics was a late 19th-century political theory based on the positivist philosophy of Auguste Comte. Proponents of scientific politics advocated a society and political system that was to be organized in accordance with the laws of nature.

Scientific politics was considered to be a sort of liberalism, more specifically conservative liberalism. Proponents of scientific politics rejected liberal jacobinism, and sought to replace revolution with evolution. They rejected classical liberal notions like individual rights, natural law, and constitutionalism as 'metaphysical' and disruptive to social and political evolution. They were willing to sacrifice political liberties such as universal suffrage in order to foster order and social and political progress, which were considered prerequisites for the existence of liberty. Nonetheless proponents of scientific politics didn't consider themselves to be opponents of liberalism, but rather its heirs. They shared the liberal views in support of republicanism, secularism and the importance of progress. Some, but not all, proponents of scientific politics also espoused Social Darwinism.

Most proponents of scientific politics could be found in France, the Ottoman Empire, Spain and Latin America. The rule of Porfirio Díaz in Mexico and Juan Vicente Gómez in Venezuela was justified by their supporters using the theories of scientific politics. The national motto of Brazil, Order and Progress (Ordem e Progresso), was one of the main adages of scientific politics.
