= Jose de Teresa =

Mexican politician

José Nicolás de Teresa y Miranda (August 23, 1850, Puebla, Mexico - January 11, 1902, in Vienna, Austria,) was a Mexican businessman and politician. His parents were Nicolás de Teresa y Sánchez Tamés, founder of the Banco Mercantil Mexicano, and Dolores Miranda Muñoz, daughter of the vice-consul of Spain in Mexico. The family of José de Teresa supported financially Benito Juárez during the civil wars in Mexico between the liberal and conservative parties in the 19th century.

José de Teresa married María Luisa Romero Rubio on July 2, 1886, daughter of the famous politician Manuel Romero Rubio and sister-in-law of Porfirio Díaz, who was the president of Mexico from 1876 to 1911. He became City Council of Mexico and Senator of Yucatán.

José de Teresa was the first ambassador of Mexico in Austria-Hungary when finally the diplomatic relations between the two countries were re-established after a long period of tensions following the execution of Maximilian I of Mexico in 1867 by hands of Benito Juarez. José de Teresa died in Vienna, and some rumors interpreted it as the Austrian revenge for the murder of Maximiliano.

José de Teresa created the Centro Mercantil, the first store to accept credit sales in Mexico. The building that José de Teresa commanded for the Centro Mercantil was constructed in Portal de Mercaderes and became the first in Art Nouveau style in Mexico. It now hosts the Grand Hotel of Mexico City, one of the most luxurious hotels in Mexico City.
