= Lola Creel =

Mexican documentarian, director, and producer

- Born: "Lola Creel Miranda; September 1, 1955 (age 70)
- Occupations: Documentarian, film director, producer
- Years active: 1975-present
- Known for: her work as film director and writer
- Notable work: Journey to Hanuman

Lola Creel (born 1 September 1955) is a Mexican documentarian, film director, and producer. Her documentaries often center on poetry, art, and their creators. Her films and scripts are connected with the human search for inner freedom and self realization.

== Career ==
Creel produced the round table series Encuentros, which included guests such as Frank Capra, Costa Gavras, and Roman Polanski, on Televisa in 1975 and 1976. She then wrote and produced National Autonomous University of Mexico's Radio Universidad in 1985 and 1986, and directed the radio programs Series Divagarte and Series Horizon XXI for Education Radio from 1992 to 2000. In 1993 and 1994, she produced music concerts for private and institutional clients such as the Academia Nacional de Medicina's Quartet and the National Congress for Rheumatology's Prieto Quartet.

Creel has directed a number of documentaries about poets and artists, including Jose Juan Tablada, Alfonso Reyes, Carlos Pellicer, Xavier Villaurrutia, W. S. Merwin, W. D. Snodgrass, Billy Collins, Octavio Paz, and Georgia O'Keeffe. She directed a series of documentary about emeriti in Mexico: Teodoro González de León, Ricardo Legorreta, and Vicente Rojo (2000). She also directed a 90-documentary series dedicated to the arts between 2000 and 2004. In 2002-2003, she produced an exhibition in homage to Bill Viola at the Palacio de Bellas Artes in Mexico City.

She directed the National Council for Culture and the Arts' Special Project Unit from 2001 to 2004. The unit was dedicated to the development of digital arts in Mexico and created to increase public appreciation of emerging digital art forms. In 2002, she directed the International Video and Electronic Art Festival in Mexico City as well as exhibitions by Joan Jonas, Peter Campus, and Lorna Simpson with collaborator David Ross Chair of MFA Art school of Visual Arts New York.

Her documentary Journey to Hanuman took nearly a decade (2004-2013) to complete. The film, which she directed, edited, and produced, attempted to preserve moments of India untouched by globalization. Some of the imagery was inspired by Octavio Paz's poetry as well as Ramayana. The film was selected for the Raindance Film Festival London in September 2013.

(2020 to 2025) She is a writer of "Now is Now" a script trilogy related to the poet Octavio Paz when he was ambassador of Mexico to India in 1968, and connected to her own life and experiences in India from 1976 to 1982.

== Personal life ==
Lola Creel is the sister of senator and former interior secretary Santiago Creel Miranda.
