= Jerónimo Treviño =

Mexican general and governor (1835–1914)

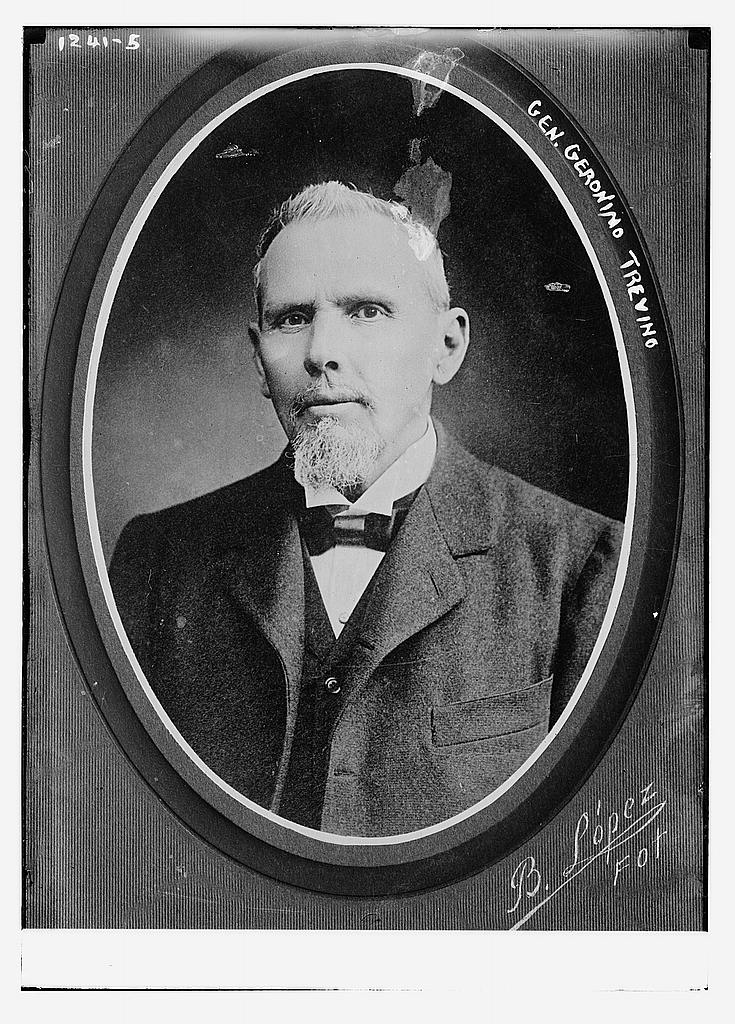

Governor of Nuevo León
- In office December 4, 1867 – October 4, 1871
- President: Benito Juárez
- Preceded by: Manuel Z. Gómez
- Succeeded by: Genaro Garza García
- In office March 12, 1877 – April 16, 1877
- President: Porfirio Díaz
- Preceded by: Genaro Garza García
- Succeeded by: Genaro Garza García
- In office February 22, 1913 – March 24, 1913
- President: Victoriano Huerta
- Preceded by: Viviano L. Villarreal
- Succeeded by: Salomé Botello

Secretary of War and Navy of Mexico
- In office December 1, 1880 – December 31, 1881
- President: Manuel González Flores
- Preceded by: Carlos Pacheco Villalobos
- Succeeded by: Francisco Naranjo

Personal details
- Born: November 17, 1835 Cadereyta Jiménez, Nuevo León, Mexico
- Died: November 14, 1914 (aged 78) Laredo, Texas, U.S.
- Party: Liberal Party
- Spouses: María Elena de Jesús Barragán Portillo (m. 1867; died 1875) Roberta Augusta Ord (m. 1880; died 1884) María Guadalupe Zambrano (m. 1885)

Military service
- Allegiance: Second Federal Republic of Mexico; Restored Republic; Porfiriato; Maderistas
- Branch: Mexican Army
- Years of service: 1858 – 1884; 1909 – 1914
- Rank: Divisional General
- Battles/wars: List: Ayutla Revolution; Reform War; Battle of the Bufa; Battle of Guadalajara; Battle of Atenquique; Battle of Ahualulco; Battle of Carretas; Battle of Estancia de las Vacas; Battle of San Juan de los Lagos (WIA); Second Franco-Mexican War; Siege of Puebla; Battle of Santa Isabel; Battle of Santa Gertrudis; Battle of San Jacinto; Siege of Querétaro (WIA); Plan de la Noria; Battle of Cerro de la Bufa; Tuxtepec Revolution; Battle of Icamole; Mexican Revolution

José Jerónimo de los Dolores Treviño y Leal (1835 – 1914), commonly known as Jerónimo Treviño was a prominent Mexican General and politician. He was a veteran of the Reform War and the Second French intervention in Mexico which he gained fame for his participation in several battles. After the fall of the Second Mexican Empire, Treviño served as the Governor of Nuevo León on several terms as well as the Secretary of War and Navy of Mexico from December 1, 1880, to December 31, 1881, under the cabinet of Manuel González Flores.

Along with General Francisco Naranjo, he became the strong man of the northeast of the country, with the support of Governor Genaro Garza García. However, his influence and power in Mexico diminished with the coming to power of General Bernardo Reyes. He came to participate in the beginning of the Mexican Revolution after the fall of Bernardo Reyes, and Francisco I. Madero in the overthrow of Porfirio Díaz. After the events of the Ten Tragic Days and the rise to power of Victoriano Huerta, he was reappointed Governor of Nuevo León, a position in which he lasted a month. He refused to be part of the movement against Huerta, so he went into exile in the United States, where he later died.

== Childhood ==
He was born in the Hacienda de Chihuahua (also known as "Chihuahuita"), in the town of Cadereyta Jiménez, Nuevo León on November 17, 1835 and was baptized on the 22nd of the same month, being the sixth of the seven children of Don Antonio Treviño y Pereyra and Doña María Francisca Leal Tijerina who were modest ranchers who lived off the produce of the land. From an early age, Jerónimo was distinguished by his intelligence and agility in sports, particularly horseback riding. He completed his primary studies in his native Cadereyta, where he learned to read and write, as well as some Catholic doctrines and arithmetics, according to the prevailing Lancastrian method at that time. He later he attended high school at the Monterrey Seminary, but had to interrupt his studies when the Reform War broke out.

== Military career ==
In 1856 Treviño joined the Nuevo León National Guard, fighting in the defense of the Citadel of Monterrey against the troops of the then Governor of Tamaulipas, General Juan José de la Garza who was sent by President Ignacio Comonfort to fight the governor of Nuevo León, Santiago Vidaurri. He began his military career as a lieutenant in the 1st San Luis Lancers Corps on January 15, 1858, later with the "Blusas" under the command of General Juan Zuazua and became part of the First North Cavalry Corps. He was promoted to Captain for his participation in the fight on April 25, 1859, and the following year, he was appointed Squadron Commander.

=== Reform War ===
In the period that elapsed between the Reformists and the restoration of the Republic, he participated in numerous important military actions, among which stand out: the battles of la Bufa, Carretas Zacatecas and Guadalajara as well as in San Luis Potosí, Atenquique, Ahualulco, San Juan de los Lagos, where he was injured, and in Garita de San Cosme, in Mexico City. While in Nuevo León, he continued to support the Liberals, even when the differences between President Benito Juárez and Governor Vidaurri became irreconcilable.

Treviño came to participate in the events that arose in Nuevo León, when at that time disputes arose between Governor Vidaurri and the Liberal chiefs Santos Degollado and Ignacio Zaragoza, siding with them against Vidaurri, who deposed him and placed him in the government of Nuevo León to General José Silvestre Aramberri.

=== French Invasion ===
During the Second French intervention in Mexico, Treviño participated in the Siege of Puebla in 1863, from which he managed to escape to fight in San Lorenzo under the orders of Ignacio Comonfort, but when he was defeated, Treviño went to Oaxaca under the orders of Mariano Escobedo and then in the Isthmus of Tehuantepec, next to Porfirio Díaz. In that same year he obtained the rank of Lieutenant Colonel.

While in Oaxaca in 1865, he made a very long journey on horseback from north to south from Oaxaca to Nuevo León to meet with Mariano Escobedo, being accompanied by other soldiers, such as General Pedro Martínez. In 1866, when Nuevo León was in the hands of the French and Mexican Imperialists, important battles took place in which Treviño, who had been promoted to Colonel of cavalry, participated in an outstanding manner, such as in the Battle of Santa Isabel, near Parras which occurred on the first. On March 1, 1866, where he fought under the orders of General Andrés S. Viesca, in which Treviño was promoted to Brigadier General, and in which he managed to take more than 300 prisoners.

Treviño also came to stand out in the famous Battle of Santa Gertrudis, in that same 1866, in which the Mexican army, under the command of General Escobedo, unquestionably defeated the Imperial Mexican forces, the Battle of San Jacinto against Miramón, and in the Siege of Querétaro in which he was wounded and where the capture of Emperor Maximilian I was achieved.

== Governor of Nuevo León ==
With the advent of French defeat, Juárez entrusted General Treviño with the military command of the Plaza de México, which he left on December 4, 1867, when he was appointed constitutional governor of Nuevo León, in recognition of his services.

=== Administration ===
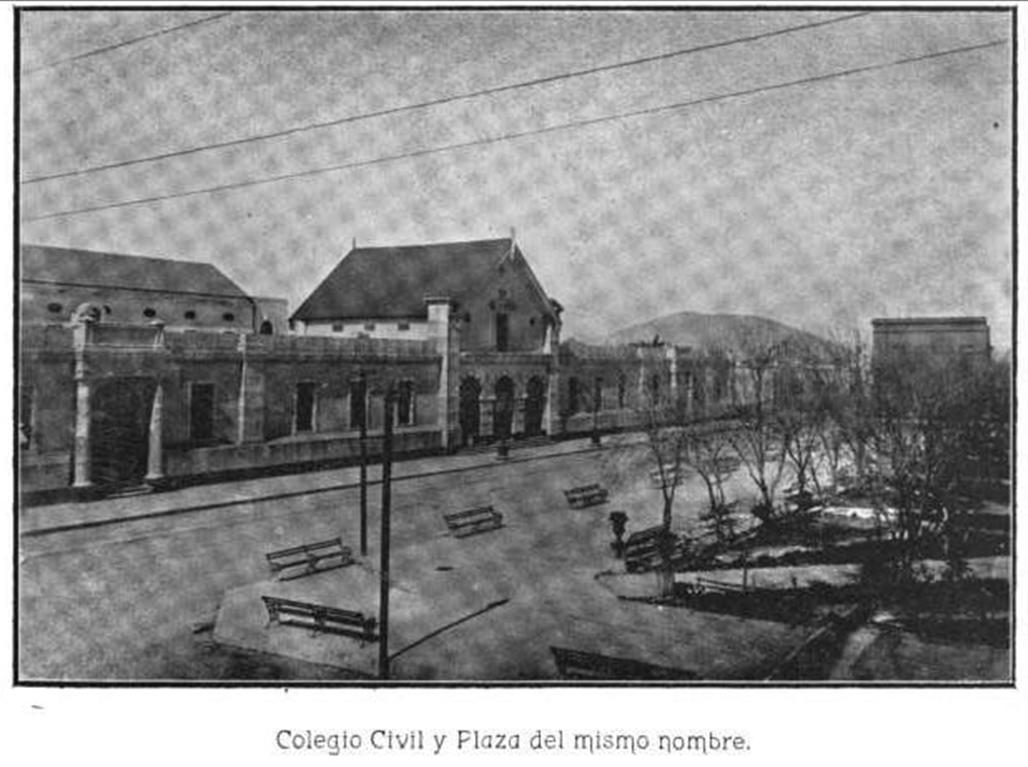
The Colegio Civil, built in 1870, it would later be incorporated within the Autonomous University of Nuevo León.

According to the historian Santiago Roel, Jerónimo Treviño wasn't very notable during his Governorship of Nuevo León and it has even been claimed that Treviño lacked competency as a statesman as he generally preferred the battlefield.

The regulations promulgated for the González Hospital are remembered from his administration, he granted pardon for those who had been involved against the government, improvements were made to the National Guard and higher education was given a boost when the Colegio Civil was completed in September 1870, which had been founded in 1859 by decree of Governor José Silvestre Aramberri and the Normal School of Professors was also created, the latter at the time he requested a leave of absence from the government, being replaced by José Eleuterio González.

Another contribution his government made was the beginning of the construction of the highway that crosses the Sierra Madre Oriental through the mouth of Santa Rosa and connects with the southern portions of the state. On August 15, 1870, telegraphic communication began with the Capital of the Republic and some municipal seats, such as Cadereyta Jiménez, in October of the same year. In addition, support was given to industrialization, for example, the installation of a white canvas factory that was authorized in May 1871, a company that to date, with difficulties, operated in El Cercado, under the name of Textiles de Monterrey, a subsidiary of the El Porvenir Warehouses.

=== Cenobio Díaz's revolt ===
At the end of 1868, a former imperialist commander named Cenobio Díaz escaped from Monterrey, organized a party of 25 men, and entered Villa del Carmen, proclaiming the 1857 Constitution and ignoring the state authorities. He was working in conjunction with General Quiroga who, from Laredo, Texas, was preparing an armed movement against the general government. Treviño, at the head of a fraction of the troops, chased him, catching up with him in Mamuliqui and defeating him. Díaz was able to escape and entered Tamaulipas, where he was later apprehended.

=== New Villas ===
On December 9, 1868, the "El Puntiagudo" ranch was renamed to what is now known as the municipality of General Treviño which was initially a villa. The municipalities of General Escobedo were also created in the old Hacienda del Topo de los Ayala, in honor of General Mariano Escobedo, the former rancho del Toro became General Bravo in honor of the insurgent general Nicolás Bravo and the San José hacienda was transformed into the Villa de Juárez.

=== Re-election in 1869 ===
In October 1869 Treviño was re-elected, for which he held the position for two consecutive terms. During this stage the situation in the state continued to worsen as the hacienda was completely bankrupt and the contribution system was so unequal to the extent that workers and peasants began to emigrate because they could not cover the personal taxes that had been applied to them.

== Plan de la Noria ==
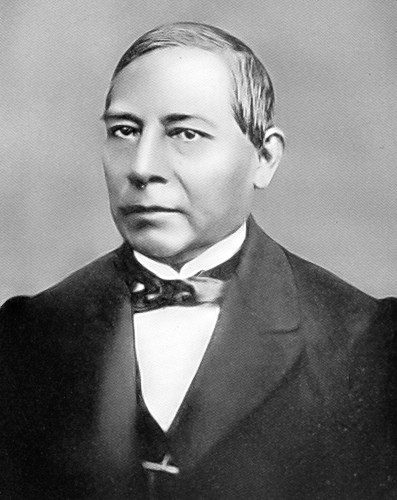
When President Benito Juárez ran for re-election in 1871, many former supporters of him opposed his re-election and the Plan de la Noria was conceived to overturn the election. It was run by Porfirio Díaz and Treviño himself supported Díaz's cause.

Due to the fact that at the end of 1871 the period of government for which he was elected concluded, on March 18 of that year, Treviño issued a manifesto indicating:

...the advisability of not working for his re-election in the government, because of this Otherwise, democratic principles would be betrayed and that it was essential to set our sights on new men.

On September 19, 1871, in the midst of an opposition environment, Treviño was again declared Governor of the State for the biennium of 1871 to 1873, in elections considered to be fraudulent against Simón de la Garza Melo. However, he would not take office, since eight days later, on September 27, he published a manifesto in which he refused to recognize President Benito Juárez, accusing him of wanting to perpetuate himself in the presidency of the Republic, and joined the Plan of la Noria led by Porfirio Díaz. Treviño then left Monterrey to fight and on October 4, he left Genaro Garza García as governor and military commander. Treviño was supported by generals Francisco Naranjo, Ignacio, Pedro Martínez, Trinidad García de la Cadena, Donato Guerra, and Díaz himself.

The nonconformists at first made progress, but were defeated by forces loyal to the government under the command of Generals Sóstenes Rocha and Lázaro Garza Ayala in the Battle of Cerro de Bufa. This resulted in the rebels handing over their weapons and agreeing to withdraw. With this, Treviño retired to his hacienda "La Babia", in Múzquiz, Coahuila. Given this attitude of the rebels, President Juárez ignored the rebelling generals and appointed Garza Ayala as Governor and Military Commander of the State.

When Benito Juárez died on July 18, 1872, he was succeeded by Sebastián Lerdo de Tejada, who promulgated an amnesty for those who had taken up arms against the Juarista administration and Nuevo León regained order. Treviño even came to recognize the government of Lerdo de Tejada.

== Tuxtepec Revolution ==
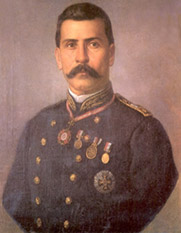
General Porfirio Díaz led two revolutions in 1871 and 1876 respectively. He led then to oppose the re-elections of Juárez and Lerdo de Tejada. Jerónimo Treviño participated in both and lead several battalions of rebels.

In January 1876, Porfirio Díaz took up arms again, brandishing the Tuxtepec Revolution, with which he opposed the re-election of Lerdo de Tejada. This was immediately supported in Nuevo León by Generals Treviño and Francisco Naranjo who sided with Díaz in the famous Battle of Icamole against Generals Carlos Fuero, Julián Quiroga and Juan E. Guerra. Fierce fighting ensued, and although they suffered several defeats, by November the rebels had defeated the loyalist forces at the Battle of Tecoac and Lerdo de Tejada fled into exile to New York City.

On November 22, 1876, General Díaz made his triumphant entry in Mexico City and acceded to the Presidency of the Republic, while Treviño, who was head of the forces in the north, recovered positions such as Saltillo and Monterrey.

Once the constitutional order was restored, after the triumph of the Tuxtepec Revolution, Treviño was elected governor and took office on March 12, 1877; however, barely a month had passed when on April 16 he presented his resignation from the position, being replaced by Genaro Garza García .

During the Tuxtepec Revolution, Jerónimo Treviño was promoted to Divisional General and was head of the Northern Division, a position in which he dedicated his efforts to pacifying the border area in conjunction with the American forces under the command of General Edward Ord and establishing business agreements with the United States until November 30, 1880, the date on which he was appointed Secretary of War and Navy of the cabinet of President Manuel González Flores. His place as head of the Northern Division was occupied by General Francisco Naranjo, but a short time later, Treviño resigned from the position of Secretary and returned to his old position, Naranjo being appointed as the new secretary. [8] It was rumored that, while he was still Secretary of War, he raised with President González his interest in becoming President of the Republic.

In March 1883, General Treviño received a visit from General Díaz and left on a mission through Europe two months after the interview, whose trip lasted more than nine months and Díaz rose suspicions about Treviño and even towards Naranjo as since both were liberals as well as that both Treviño and Naranjo were strongly linked to Governor Genaro Garza García. For this reason he decided to withdraw all command of the troops until the outbreak of the Mexican Revolution.

== Entrepreneurship ==
On June 25, 1884, Treviño retired from the militia and dedicated himself to farming his properties in Coahuila as well as to industrial and livestock activities. Precisely in Coahuila, he organized a demarcation company of vacant land that allowed him to appropriate many acres as it was reported that he owned a million hectares at one point. He also had investments in the mining and smelting branches, in banks, transportation and complementary services. Likewise, in 1887, Treviño, together with John A. Robertson, participated in the company that built the railroad from Monterrey to the Gulf and the branch line to Piedras Negras and intervened in the industrial boom of Monterrey by positively influencing some foreign companies to invest in Nuevo León. Treviño also became one of the founding shareholders of the Banco Mercantil de Monterrey in 1899.

== Family ==
Jerónimo Treviño married three times, being a widower of his first two wives:

On February 16, 1867, he married María Elena de Jesús Barragán Portillo, 22 years old, originally from Ciudad del Maíz, in San Luis Potosí, with whom he had four children:

- Ana Treviño Barragán, married to the German Paul Vincent Burchard (1863-1936), with whom she had 2 daughters: Olga (1890-1976) and Elena Burchard Treviño (1892-1964).
- Guadalupe Treviño Barragán born on August 26, 1868, in Monterrey, and baptized on October 11.
- José Jerónimo Treviño Barragán (1870-1875)
- Jerónimo Joaquín Treviño Barragán, born in Monterrey on August 21, 1871, and baptized on October 4.

Doña Elena Barragán died in Parras, Coahuila on June 19, 1875.

Five years later, Treviño contracted a second marriage with Roberta Augusta Ord, daughter of Edward Ord, on July 20, 1880. She gave birth to their son named Jerónimo, after his father, and who was sponsored by General Díaz in a visit to Monterrey in 1883. Mrs. Ord died on February 10, 1884, while her husband was traveling through Europe, leaving Treviño a widower for the second time.

Treviño later married María Guadalupe Zambrano while on a visit to Monterrey on April 13, 1885, but would have no children with her.

== Mexican Revolution ==
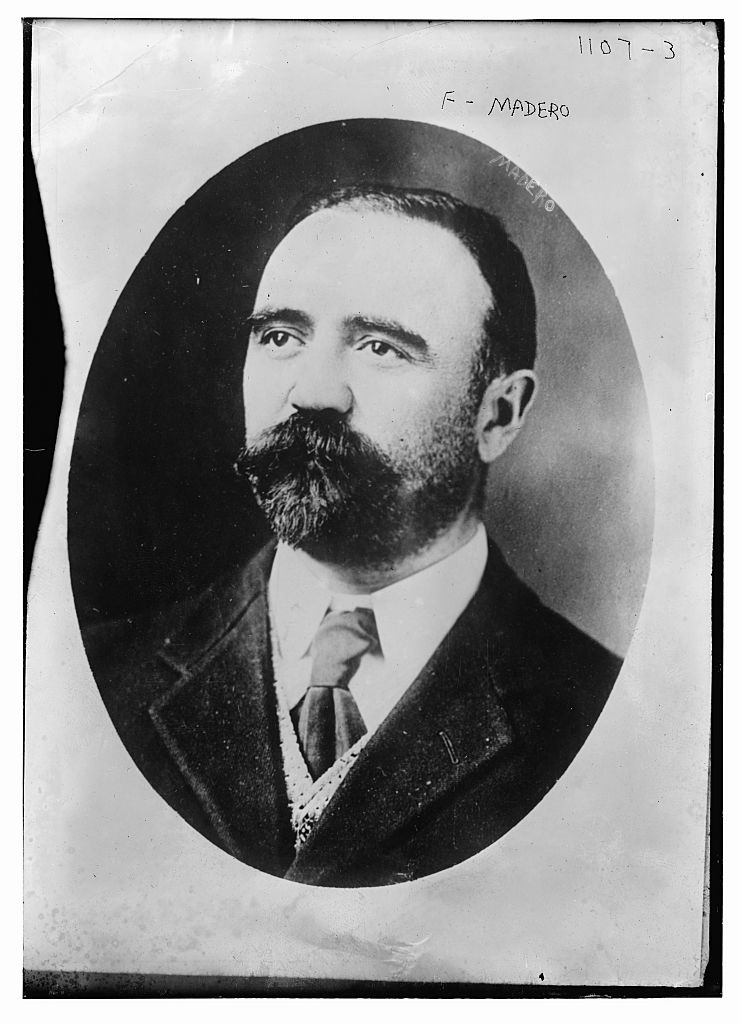
After deaths of President Francisco I. Madero and José María Pino Suárez, General Treviño held the governorship of Nuevo León again, replacing then-governor Viviano L. Villarreal for a month.

=== Fall of the Porfiriato ===
In the year of 1909, and before the advent of the 1910 Mexican general election, Díaz, who was suspicious of the popularity that Bernardo Reyes had achieved in recent months, decided to remove him from the government and appointing Treviño, then 73 years old, as Chief of the III Military Zone based in Monterrey as Treviño was an old political rival of Reyes. Although he accepted the appointment "half-heartedly and almost indifferently," Treviño seized the opportunity to shatter Reyes' power through control of the army.

However, this appointment became a double-edged sword for Díaz, since, by returning military authority to Treviño for the simple purpose of making Reyes renounce his interest in the vice presidency, it would also mean a mortal blow to his regime which very soon would end up leading to the armed movement led by Francisco I. Madero, General Treviño's cousin-in-law and would go on to become one of the biggest figures behind the newly formed Maderista movement.

To erode the power of Reyes in the entity, Treviño replaced all the Reyist officers with people he absolutely trusted. A short time later, he went to Mexico City to hold an interview with President Díaz. On his way back to Monterrey, Treviño passed through Saltillo to meet the governor of Coahuila, Miguel Cárdenas de los Santos, whom Treviño forced to sign his resignation as governor.

An editor for the newspaper El Noticiero by the name of Juan Luis Cantú assured that, at the end of 1910, Treviño and Madero were in constant communication and made a pact of non-violence in the State, by the followers of the latter. However, despite this, armed groups emerged belatedly in May 1911 that carried out a series of incursions through the municipal seats in the Porfiriato. In 1911, Treviño handed over the leadership of the Zone to General José María Mier, a former subordinate of his and who was appointed governor of Nuevo León after Reyes' resignation 2 years earlier.

=== Maderista Regime ===
After the fall of the Porfiriato, Madero and Treviño returned to establish friendly relations to, this time, elect the candidate for the governorship of the State in the renewal of the Supreme Powers on June 4, 11 and 18. At first Treviño leaned towards Francisco Naranjo García, the son of his old friend General Francisco Naranjo but he did not hinder the triumph of Viviano L. Villarreal, former collaborator of the general, and who had already been governor of the State in the biennium 1879–1881, for the period that would comprise from 1911 to 1915 in relatively peaceful elections, defeating Ing. Naranjo for the Independent Party.

At the same time, Madero reconfirmed Treviño as Chief of the Military Zone, and once this was done, Treviño, on his own, had Reyes constantly watched and his supporters on both sides of the Rio Grande, thanks to the work of Texan District Attorney Juan A. Valls. Meanwhile, Reyes proclaimed the Plan of the Soledad on November 16, ignoring the powers emanating from the last elections and appointed himself Provisional President. The plan failed, and Reyes voluntarily surrendered to the authorities in Linares on December 24, 1911. The next day, while having a meal with his wife and other relatives, General Treviño received a telegram informing him of the capture of Reyes in the municipality of Linares.

=== Return to Governorship ===
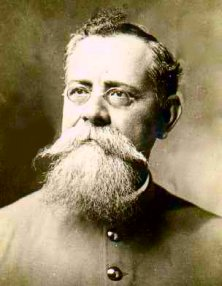
Venustiano Carranza took up arms against Victoriano Huerta and at that time he asked General Jerónimo Treviño to be part of the Constitutional Army but Treviño rejected the offer due to his age as he was 78 years old.

After the Ten Tragic Days which resulted in the deaths of President Madero and Vice President José María Pino Suárez, Governor Villarreal presented his resignation to the Local Congress, leaving the Congress with no alternative to elect someone who impose order and not provoke an immediate estrangement from the central government. After hours of intense discussion, Congress unanimously declared the return of General Treviño to the governorship. Treviño took office on February 22.

Treviño used his influences, and, together with the Rodolfo Reyes, managed to free the mayor of Monterrey Nicéforo Zambrano, the head of the secret and municipal police Alfredo Pérez Garza, and the alderman Jerónimo Siller who they had been arrested by the Huertista government and sent to Mexico City, accused of trying to carry out an insurrection against the central government and the influences of Treviño and Reyes prevented them from being executed.

Despite his return to the governorship, Treviño no longer represented the leadership he had shown in past times, being simply a mere symbolic figure, and represented a great lack of leadership in the state, which had occurred since the resignation of Bernardo Reyes, and whose influence was still present. This became evident when the Federal Army easily took over Monterrey from loose orders and was something that was not easy for Treviño to accept. Another contributing factor was that General Emiliano Lojero, head of the military zone replacing General Mier, had not the slightest intention of subordinating himself to Treviño's authority.

Victoriano Huerta who knew the prestige that Treviño enjoyed in the northeast of the country, and once his government was recognized by the local congress, decided to keep him under close surveillance, just as his former protector, General Reyes, had done. Treviño, who was accustomed to unconditional military loyalty, could not bear Lojero's mistrust and on March 19, and without any explanation, Treviño presented his resignation to Congress, which took both public officials and the population in general by surprise. Shortly after Treviño was apprehended and taken to Mexico City, without any explanation, being released shortly after. After this incident, Treviño decided to voluntarily exile himself to New Orleans.

=== Constitutionalist Revolution ===
While Treviño was in New Orleans, he received a message from General Aureliano Blanquet, then Minister of War, to occupy the Presidency of the Supreme Military Court "in view of his relevant military career", for which he was forced to return to Mexico. On September 15, 1913, Treviño was appointed President of the Supreme Military Court, although he would never assume said position, since on November 29, and for health reasons, he was relieved of fulfilling such commission.

After Madero's assassination and Huerta's rise to power, the Governor of Coahuila, Venustiano Carranza, launched the Plan of Guadalupe to disregard General Huerta's presidency. At that time, Carranza had contemplated the veteran General Treviño to join the Constitutional Army, for which he sent him an offer, proposing him the leadership of the revolutionary movement and for this he sent two Captain Rafael Saldaña and Eliseo Arredondo as emissaries. However, in both situations, Treviño, due to his elderly age, ended up declining the offer, which gave rise to rumors that Treviño aspired to occupy the presidency of the Republic.

He suffered, without being able to do anything, the threat of land distribution and, faced with his own limitations, he emigrated towards the Mexico–United States border. He died in Laredo, Texas on November 13, 1914, just three days before his 79th birthday. His remains were returned to Monterrey, where he was given honors worthy of a military leader. He was buried in the Panteón de El Carmen in the city of Monterrey.

== Legacy ==
General Treviño in Northern Nuevo León was named after Treviño and several streets across the state were named after him. Jerónimo Treviño was portrayed by Héctor Sáez in the telenovela El vuelo del águila.
