= José Silvestre Aramberri =

Mexican governor and general (1840–1887)

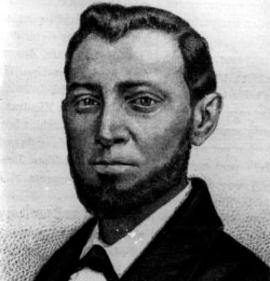

Governor of Nuevo León y Coahulia
- In office September 25, 1859 – December 5, 1859
- President: Benito Juárez
- Preceded by: Santiago Vidaurri
- Succeeded by: Domingo Martínez

Governor of the Federal District
- In office September 20, 1862 – January 23, 1863
- Preceded by: Jose Maria Gonzalez de Mendoza
- Succeeded by: Domingo Martínez

Personal details
- Born: 1823 Valle de Río Blanco, Nuevo León, New Spain, Spain
- Died: January 27, 1864 (aged 40–41) Doctor Arroyo, Nuevo León, Mexico
- Party: Liberal Party
- Spouse: Rosario Lozano (m. 1851)

Military service
- Allegiance: Mexico
- Branch: Mexican Army
- Years of service: 1854–1864
- Rank: General de Brigada
- Battles/wars: Plan of Ayutla; Reform War: Battle of Puerto de Carretas; Battle of Silao; Battle of Lagos de Moreno; Battle of Ahualulco; Second French intervention in Mexico †

José Silvestre Aramberri Lavín (1816 – January 27, 1864) was a Mexican Brigadier General and an engineer who fought in the Plan of Ayutla, Reform War and the Second French intervention in Mexico. He was governor of the former state of Nuevo León y Coahulia, succeeding General Santiago Vidaurri for 2 months and was a major contributor to the establishment of the Colegio Civil, the cradle of the Autonomous University of Nuevo León. Aramberri was also the Governor of the Federal District but was killed while escorting President Benito Juárez to Nuevo León from the French and Imperial Mexican forces.

== Childhood ==
Aramberri's birth date remains a point of contention as most sources state that he was born in 1816 but others state that he was born in 1823 or 1825. In all sources though, it's confirmed that he was born at the Hacienda of "La Soledad" within the vicinity of Valle de Río Blanco, Nuevo León as the son of Cosme Aramberri, founder of the Villa Doctor Arroyo and Dolores Lavín y Arenas. José was a student at the Monterrey Seminary and spent the rest of his studies within Mexico City and graduated as an engineer in 1851. On September 29 of the same year, he married Rosario Lozano, widow of Juan Ignacio Prado, in the Monterrey Cathedral and they would later have 4 children together. In 1852, he was commander of the canton of Galeana.

== Military career ==
=== Ayutla Revolution ===
Three years later, he joined the forces commanded by Santiago Vidaurri to support the Plan of Ayutla as a whole, being entrusted with the organization of forces in the towns in the south of the state. He attended the capture of Saltillo on July 23, where the loyalist chief Francisco Güitián was defeated .

Under the orders of Juan Zuazua, Aramberri participated in the strategic movement of September 13, 1855, besieging Anastasio Parrodi in San Luis Potosí. He accompanied the governor of Potosí to the conferences in Lagos, where the revolution reigned victorious and was recognized and the meeting of the Constituent Congress was proposed. Aramberri then returned to Monterrey with the rank of colonel and was appointed commander of the 6th Canton within southern Nuevo León.

=== Reform War ===
When the Congress of 1856 was installed, Aramberri was elected as a substitute for Dr. José Sotero Noriega for deputy for the third district. When Vidaurri was attacked on the occasion of the annexation of Coahuila to Nuevo León, Aramberri went to Monterrey to fight Juan José de la Garza in the Citadel alongside Ignacio Zaragoza. In 1856, when the state resisted the Comonfort statute, Aramberri, with the forces of the canton of Galeana, observed the movements of Vicente Rosas Landa and conferred with him at Matehuala which led to the Treaty of Cuesta de los Muertos.

Later in 1857, Vidaurri went to fight Alfaro and Othón in San Luis Potosí. With a regiment of riflemen, he defended the exit from Querétaro. During the Reform War, he went to the interior of the country with Mariano Escobedo at the head of the 2nd Nuevo León Infantry Regiment. He fought in the Battle of Puerto de Carretas, being notable enough to be mentioned by Zuazua. After this action, with 500 riflemen, he participated in the assault on Bufa Hill and in the capture of Zacatecas by Julián Quiroga. He was entrusted with attacking Chacón, who had defeated Anacleto de la Rosa in Charcas. After occupying San Luis Potosí, he marched to recover Guanajuato and deposed the governor and imposed Verduzco. He also partook in the battles of Silao, León and stood in the Battle of Lagos de Moreno to intercept the passage of Miguel Miramón.

In the Battle of Ahualulco, on September 29, 1858, Aramberri commanded 1,200 men, aided by Jesús Fernández García and Máximo Campos . Once Vidaurri's forces were defeated, he continued at the side of Zuazua in the campaign, to return to Monterrey.

== Governor of Nuevo León and Coahuila ==
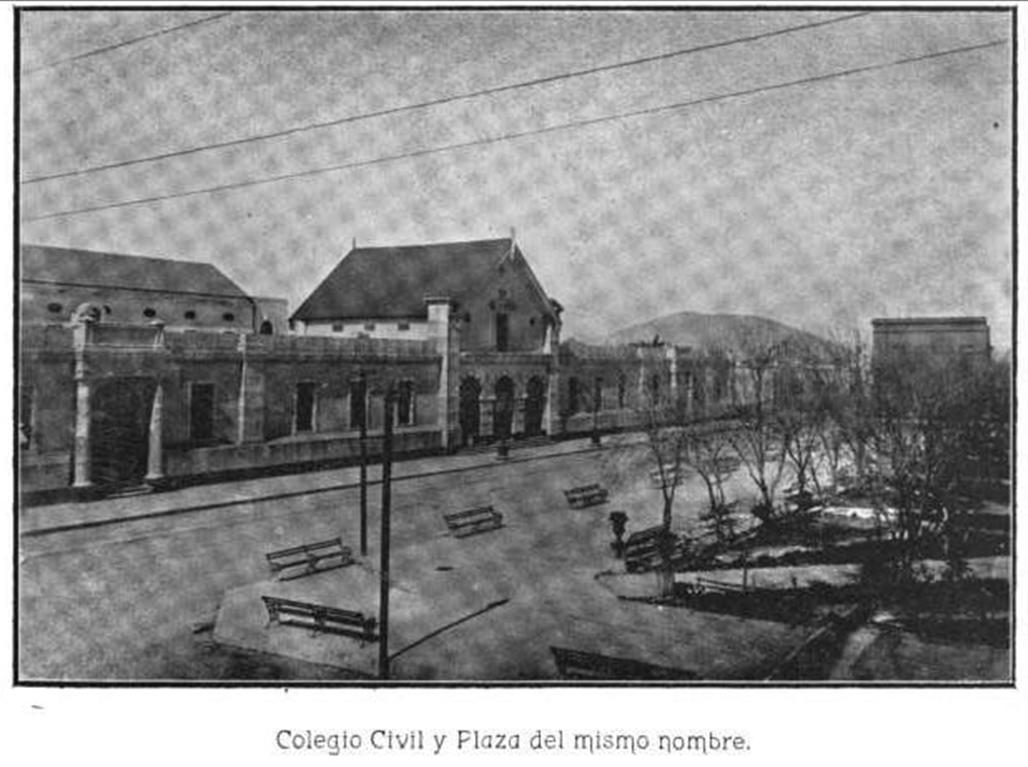
The Colegio Civil was founded during the government of José Silvestre Aramberri, at the same time that the chairs were opened, leaving Dr. José Eleuterio González as its director.

Following the struggles of Santos Degollado and Ignacio Zaragoza with Vidaurri, he was deposed from the governorship and Aramberri assumed command of the state. During the scarce two months that he lasted as governor of Nuevo León y Coahuila, Aramberri managed to reorganize the army and used the faculty that was originally granted in 1857 to the then governor Vidaurri to found the Colegio Civil, whose chairs were initiated on December 5 of that same 1859. This included secondary or preparatory instruction and the related careers of Jurisprudence and Medicine, the latter lasting six years, which was founded on October 30, 1859, and whose direction was in charge Dr. José Eleuterio González which included the implementation of a pharmacy.

After a referendum was held to decide whether the governor was to be Aramberri himself or the president of the Superior Court of Justice, he was replaced in office by Domingo Martínez.

== Continuation of Conflicts ==
Vidaurri returned his military career and Aramberri was confined to Canelo on January 16, 1860. In Galeana, he along with Mariano Escobedo, Lázaro Garza Ayala, Jerónimo Treviño and others, the Congresistas movement, but they were beaten in Santa Rosa and Saltillo and forced to leave the state. Colonel Antonio Pérez y Villarreal, one of his political enemies, published Aramberri's Oja (sic) de Servicios... in Bustamante on February 23, exposing the negative aspects of his aspirations to retain government. Aramberri then traveled to Matamoros to persuade Carvajal to hand over weapons acquired from the United States.

On July 30, 1860, a column of his troops, led by Eugenio García, attacked General Juan Zuazua's forces at the San Gregorio hacienda within the vicinity of Ramos Arizpe, Coahuila. In the confrontation, Zuazua died as a result of a shot to the head that caused his instant death, without having enough time to be able to use his weapons. Incorporated in San Luis Potosí to the Army of the North, he was appointed second in chief. Aramberri then participated in the Capture of Guadalajara, from October 6 to 30, 1860, seizing the possessions of Santo Domingo. He fought Leonardo Márquez in Zapotlanejo on November 1 and on December 22 he participated in the victory of Calpulalpan.

=== Second French Intervention ===
In January 1861 he entered Mexico with the triumphant forces, concluding the Three Years' War. For his merits in the campaign, Aramberri was promoted to brigadier general. During this time, Aramberri briefly served as the Governor of the Federal District from September 20, 1862, to January 23, 1863. He accompanied Juárez on his pilgrimage north, during the Second French Intervention in Mexico, reaching as far as Matehuala. Seriously ill, he continued to the Hacienda del Canelo within the vicinity of Doctor Arroyo, where he was poisoned on January 27, 1864.

== Legacy ==
The State Congress named Valle de Río Blanco to Aramberri in recognition of Aramberri on October 26, 1877. He was buried in Matehuala in 1926, his remains were transferred to Aramberri, at the initiative of the Union of Journalists of Matehuala during the third centenary of the foundation of the mission of Santa María de los Ángeles de Río Blanco. His remains are buried in the Esplanade of the Heroes, in the Macroplaza of Monterrey.
