= José Cevallos Cepeda =

Mexican politician and military leader (1831-1893)

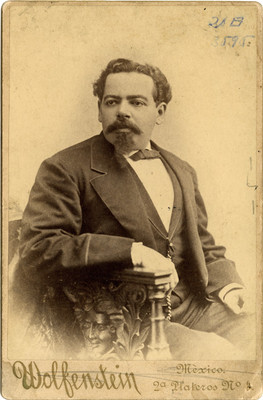
- Born: 1831; Durango
- Died: 19 April 1893; Mexico City

José Cevallos Cepeda (1831 – April 19, 1893) was a Mexican politician and military leader.

== Early life ==
Cevallos was born in Durango City in 1831. He enrolled in the Heroic Military Academy in Mexico City and reached the rank of captain in May 1855. After the Revolution of Ayutla, he joined the liberal ranks, and when the War of Reform broke out in 1857, he participated in fighting near Mexico City between March and April 1859, taking part in the Battle of Silao and in the Battle of Calpulalpan.

== Second French Intervention ==
During the Second French Intervention in Mexico he participated in the Battle of Puebla, however, he was taken prisoner months later when the French siege eventually succeeded. While being transported to Veracruz, he managed to escape and rejoin the ranks of the liberals. After campaigning in Mazatlán, he was again captured and this time sent to Baja California. However, he escaped and participated in the taking of Mexico City in 1867.

== Restored Republic ==
After the war, he was appointed governor and military commander of Yucatán from 1 February to 2 April 1869. The capital Mérida was under a state of siege due to insurgencies. In 1870 he was the military commander of Veracruz. He fought in Oaxaca against the insurgents during the Plan de la Noria aimed at overthrowing President Benito Juárez. In October of that year he was appointed governor and military commander of Sinaloa and, together with Ramón Corona, participated in hunting down Manuel Lozada, which earned him the rank of division general in September 1873.

In 1876 he participated in the Plan of Tuxtepec to overthrow President Sebastián Lerdo de Tejada. It was during that time that he was military commander and governor of Jalisco. Lerdo was overthrown, but in the subsequent power struggle Porfirio Díaz triumphed over José María Iglesias and as a supporter of Iglesias, Cevallos was exiled to San Francisco, California and later to Guatemala.

== Later life ==
He returned to the country at the end of the first presidential period of Porfirio Díaz, being elected federal deputy in 1880. He was seriously wounded in the throat in a sword duel in Mexico City on 18 May 1880, by the distinguished Yucatecan gentleman Don Eduardo González Gutiérrez. He was appointed governor of the Federal District on 3 December 1884, a position he held until his death on 19 April 1893 in Mexico City.

By order of President Porfirio Díaz, his remains were interred on 22 April 1893 at the Rotunda of Illustrious Persons.
