= Lafragua law (1855) =

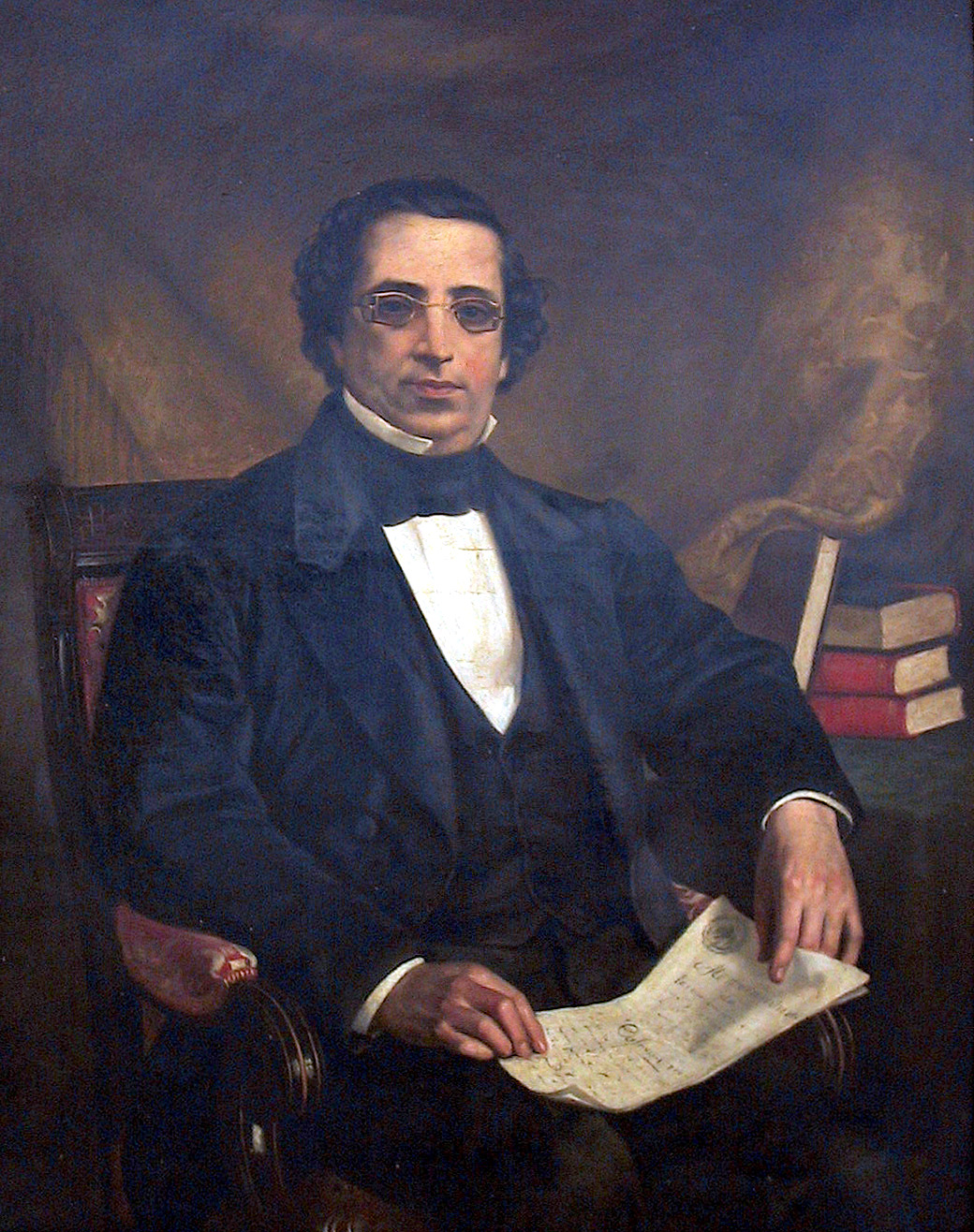
José María Lafragua (1813–1875)

The Lafragua law or the Regulation of the Freedom of the Press is named after liberal politician José María Lafragua (1813–1875) and issued on 28 December 1855. It is one of the many Reform laws when Mexican liberals ascended to power in 1855 after the ouster of conservative Antonio López de Santa Anna. The Lafragua law was drafted during the presidency of Ignacio Comonfort when Lafragua was his minister of the interior. The law states that no one should be persecuted for his political opinions and it prohibited press censorship. The authors of newspaper articles should be made responsible for their writings by signing them. They were not allowed abuse of the freedom of the press, especially in religious and governmental matters. It is considered the most moderate of the Reform Laws. This legislation was elevated to constitutional status by Articles 6 and 7th of the Political Constitution of the United Mexican States of 1857 and reaffirmed by the Organic Law of Press Freedom 1861 issued by the Congress. In contrast, it was not accepted by conservative governments of Félix Zuloaga and Miguel Miramon, who restored the repressive Lares Law during the War of the Reform (1858–1860).

== See also ==
- Liberalism in Mexico
- La Reforma

== Bibliography ==
- Zermeño, Héctor Díaz (2005). México: De la Reforma y el Imperio. ISBN 970-32-2217-X.
