= Battle of San Joaquín =

1858 battle of the Mexican Reform War

- Part of the Reform War
| Date | 26 December 1858 |
| Location | Cuauhtemoc, Colima |
| Result | Conservative victory |

Commanders and leaders
| Santos Degollado | Miguel Miramón |

The Battle of San Joaquín in the War of Reform took place on 26 December 1858 in the municipality of Cuauhtémoc (Colima, Mexico), between elements of the liberal army, under General Santos Degollado, and elements of the conservative army, commanded by General Miguel Miramón. It ended in a victory for the conservative forces.

== Battle ==
Miramón had been informed of Santos Degollado's arrival to Plaza de Colima on 25 December, and that General Contreras Medellin, the governor of the state, had met him there to defend his seat. Nevertheless, Miramón went to San Joaquín, and encountered Degollado the next day, when the battle took place.

== Conclusions ==
The victory went to the conservative side, who managed to disperse General Degollado's troops in the region. This ensured the safety of the city of Guadalajara, so Santos Degollado had to retreat in the direction of Morelia. Despite their side's victory in the battle, Medellin's supporters in Colima City were taken prisoner and shot by Daniel Larios (who was deputy from Colima to Congress), and the then secretary general of government Encarnación Reyes, who was also the mayor. Conservative Colonel Jose Maria Mendoza took charge of armed conservative forces stationed in Canyon Beltran, and returned with them to Guadalajara. They arrived on 30 December. Following a victory there, Mendoza became governor of Colima.

When General Miguel Miramón entered Mexico City on 7 January, a series of triumphal receptions were made by the Conservative government. Among them was a hymn referring to the battles that Miramón had fought in Colima. There were fireworks at the National Palace, and singing of the national anthem, to which some verses had been added in Miramón's honor by Francisco González Bocanegra, the national anthem's writer.

"By Hon. Mr. President, Mr. Miguel Miramon, in its entry to Mexico, after the campaign of Colima."

Chorus

-Glory! Glory to the undefeated warrior,

Homeland defense and honor!

Glory! glory! that whole Anahuac

everywhere proclaimed victor.

stanza

-Homeland beautiful places lauro

in the temples of the young leader,

his arms covered brightness

He led triumphant everywhere.

Colima in the high mountains

and also in the fields of stay,

vile mob of foolish arrogance

with his sword in the dust sank.

Chorus
