= Battle of Salamanca (1858) =

1858 battle in Mexico

- Part of The Reform War
Date	9 March 1858
Location	Salamanca, Guanajuato, Mexico
Result	Conservative victory

Belligerents
(Mexico) Liberals	(Mexico) Conservatives

Commanders and leaders
Anastasio Parrodi; Leandro Valle	Luis G. Osollo; Miguel Miramón

Strength
7,000; 30 guns	5,000

Casualties and losses
17 guns captured, 1,265 killed and 2,080 wounded	210 killed and 140 wounded

The Battle of Salamanca took place between 9 and 10 March 1858 in Salamanca (near Guanajuato), during Mexico's War of Reform (1858–1860). Elements of the liberal army, under General Anastasio Parrodi, governor of the Jalisco, fought with Generals Leandro Valle, Santos Degollado, and Mariano Moret, against conservatives, commanded by General Luis G. Osollo. Osollo's army had some 5,000 men, including Generals Miguel Miramón and Tomás Mejía, Francisco García Casanova. The conservatives won, handed the liberals a second liberal defeat, and forced them to retreat to Guadalajara from Guanajuato.

This battle was also known as the Battle of War Coalition (Spanish: Arroyo Feo) since the fighting between liberals and conservatives were limited to Guanajuato, Jalisco, Zacatecas, San Luis Potosí, Michoacan, and Aguascalientes. Those states formed a coalition to oppose the Plan of Tacubaya that gathred 7,000 men and 30 pieces of artillery, the same who had fought at Celaya. Parrodi blamed the liberal loss on General Mariano Moret for not ordering the cavalry charge and on Manuel Doubled for inactivity in battle.
