= Battle of Tacubaya (1859) =

1859 battle of the Mexican Reform War

- Part of Reform War
Date	11 April 1859
Location	Tacubaya, Mexico City
Result	Conservative victory

Belligerents
(Mexico) Liberals	(Mexico) Conservatives

Commanders and leaders
Santos Degollado	Leonardo Márquez

Strength
4,000	4,000

Casualties and losses
300 killed	Unknown

The Battle of Tacubaya took place on 11 April 1859 near the ancient village of Tacubaya in today's Mexico City, Mexico, between elements of the liberal army, under General Santos Degollado and elements of the conservative army commanded by General Leonardo Márquez during the War of Reform. Victory fell to the conservative side, and both armies suffered heavy casualties. After the battle General Miguel Miramón ordered Márquez to shoot the captured liberal chiefs and officers, including the head of the Army Medical Corps and other liberal doctors. The executions came to be known as the Massacre of Tacubaya, and both this and the battle itself earned Leonardo Márquez the nickname of "Tiger of Tacubaya".

== See also ==
- Tacubaya massacre
