= Battle of Atenquique =

1858 battle of the Reform War

- Part of the Reform War
Date	2 July 1858
Location	Barranca de Atenquique, Jalisco
Result	Conservative victory

Belligerents
(Mexico) Liberals	(Mexico) Conservatives

Commanders and leaders
Santos Degollado	Miguel Miramón

Strength
1,200	1,500

Casualties and losses
700 killed or wounded	611 killed or wounded

The Battle of Atenquique took place on 2 July 1858, during the Reform War, in the vicinity of the canyon Atenquique near the Nevado de Colima in the state of Jalisco, Mexico. The conflict was between elements of the liberal army, under General Santos Degollado, and conservative troops, commanded by General Miguel Miramón. The battle resulted in heavy losses for both sides. Some consider the outcome undecided, although most historians view it as a victory for the conservatives with a clear advantage: Miramón's troops gained control of the state of Jalisco. Additionally, Degollado became known as the 'Hero of the Defeats' due to his troops' constant failures.
