= Battle of Guadalajara (1858) =

1858 battle of the Mexican Reform War

- Part of the Reform War
| Date | 14 December 1858 |
| Location | Hacienda de Atequiza near Guadalajara, Jalisco |
| Result | Conservative victory |

Belligerents
| (Mexico) Liberals | (Mexico) Conservatives |

Commanders and leaders
| (Mexico) Santos Degollado | (Mexico) Miguel Miramón |

The Battle of Guadalajara (1858) took place on 14 December 1858 in the vicinity of La Hacienda de Atequiza, near the city of Guadalajara in the state of Jalisco, Mexico, during Reform War. Between elements of the liberal army, under General Santos Degollado, and elements of the conservative army commanded by Generals Miguel Miramón, Leonardo Márquez, Marcelino Cobos, the victory went to the conservative side. The conservatives attacked the ranch of San Miguel, near Poncitlán, Jalisco, where the battle took place. By the end of the battle, the conservatives had gained great quantities of weapons and other war materials. Afterwards, Miramón sent orders to shoot the captured liberal officers.

== Conclusions ==
After Márquez's departure, General Adrián Woll was left in charge of the plaza. He remained so until the second siege of the city, when the liberals under General Pedro Ogazón retook the square with the surrender of the conservative general Severo Castillo.
