= Battle of Estancia de las Vacas =

1859 Liberal/Conservative clash in Mexico

- Part of the Reform War
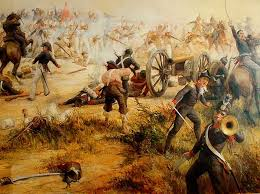
Date	13 November 1859
Location	Estancia de las Vacas, Querétaro
Result	Conservative victory

Belligerents
Liberals	Conservatives

Commanders and leaders
Santos Degollado	Leonardo Márquez

The Battle of Estancia de las Vacas took place on 13 November 1859 in the vicinity of Estancia Cows in the state of Querétaro, Mexico, between elements of the liberal army under General Santos Degollado and elements of the conservative army commanded by General Miguel Miramón during the Reform War. The conservatives inflicted a defeat despite being outnumbered two to one by the liberals.

On November 13th, before the battle, General Degollado had a meeting with General Miramón, which lasted approximately three-quarters of an hour. Miramón said that Degollado invited him to recognize the Constitution of 1857, an action that caused the Young Maccabee to refuse, assuring his rival that without so much discussion, he would defeat him that afternoon. But Miramón took advantage of the opportunity to give Woll time to come to his support. Degollado gave the order to form up in three.

Degollado gave the order to form a three-line advance, one of which was commanded by General Ignacio de la Llave from Veracruz. He ordered an advance through the center with the San Luis Potosí Brigade, and doubled its left and right flanks against the Conservative center, which staunchly resisted the Liberal attack. The march of Degollado's soldiers initially yielded good results, but in the fray, General Tapia was killed. His death, followed by that of other officers, caused the troops to become demoralized. Some were inexperienced and others semi-professional, and they were unable to continue the advance without their leaders at the front, causing them to rout. This situation was taken advantage of by the Conservative cavalry of General Tomas Mejía, who charged rapidly, penetrating the Liberal lines. Consequently, the rout turned into a flight, which dragged other units along in its wake. Degollado with his General Staff, pistol in hand, covers the retreat at 3 in the afternoon, organized in three staggered lines towards the heights of the Estancia, but on the hill panic and dispersion occurs. Mejía with the cavalry pursues the liberals to the gates of Celaya and does not catch them due to lack of ammunition.

General Degollado ventured into the Bajío, controlled by the conservative forces, who already possessed Guadalajara, Zacatecas and Guanajuato, but he brought an army strong of 6,000 men and 29 artillery pieces. Upon learning of Degollado's entry, Miramón promptly ordered the conservative forces from the surrounding areas to concentrate in the city of Querétaro, with General Francisco Vélez, encamped in Guanajuato, being the first to retreat. Once in Querétaro, he was joined by General Tomas Mejía y Miramón's cavalry, which had arrived from the capital, where he led 3,000 men and 19 artillery pieces. To further swell his ranks, he ordered General Adrían Woll to leave Zacatecas and march quickly to support him. to Marquez that with a brigade from those that were in Guadalajara he would reinforce him, of these only Woll responded, Marquez after the battle would be punished for that disobedience.

In Celaya, things were not going well for Degollado's liberals, as they were received with gunfire by the population. Degollado wrote in his diary, "That day was one of the worst in my life."

After this victory, Miramón established the Veracruz and Michoacán campaigns as his priorities in the war. Severo del Castillo had taken Zacatecas; Manuel Lozada had taken Tepic; and he considered the strategy of wiping out the liberals in southern Veracruz. The final months of 1859 were dominated by the conservative faction, which controlled half the country.
