= Jerónimo Siller =

Mexican politician (1880–1962)

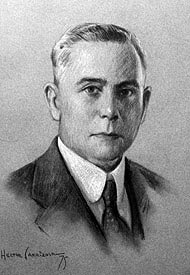

Governor of Nuevo León
- In office October 16, 1925 – October 4, 1927
- Preceded by: Porfirio G. González
- Succeeded by: Aarón Sáenz Garza

Personal details
- Born: September 30, 1880 San Pedro Garza García, Nuevo León
- Died: March 14, 1962 (aged 81) Monterrey, Nuevo León
- Party: Democratic
- Profession: Politician, army general and inventor

Jerónimo Siller Gómez (San Pedro Garza García, Nuevo León; September 30, 1880 - Monterrey, Nuevo León; March 14, 1962) was a Mexican inventor, politician and military man who participated in the Mexican Revolution. He also served as Governor of Nuevo León, replacing General Porfirio G. González, and as municipal president of Monterrey.

== Early years ==
Siller was born in San Pedro Garza García on September 30, 1880. His family was formed by three children, José María Siller Gómez, a woman of which name is not known and died at a very young age, and finally Jerónimo Siller Gómez, who became an orphan at age 10. His brother, José María Siller, was raised by Dr. Alberto Siller, who was their relative. Siller was able to learn by his account English, Drawing and Mechanics. He worked in the smelting factory Estrella and, later, he installed his own factory in Monterrey. He canalized all that learning towards his inventions; he designed several devices to adapt them to motors and diverse machines. He also liked agriculture; mainly the cultivation of oranges, walnuts and other fruit trees.

== Monterrey ==
Precursor of the Mexican Revolution, Siller formed a political club to support Francisco I. Madero, collaborating in its presidential campaign. In 1913, after Henry Lane Wilson supported Victoriano Huerta's coup, he was apprehended by the new regime and, along Nicéforo Zambrano, Alfredo Pérez and other Maderista militants, lead to Mexico City. The intervention of Jerónimo Treviño and Rodolfo Reyes prevented their execution. Deported to the United States, Siller resided in that country without breaking away from the enemy military fronts against Huerta's usurping government. Once organized the constitutionalist movement, he crossed the border and later joined the forces of Pablo González Garza and Antonio Villarreal, later those of Lucio Blanco. He participated in diverse forms in the struggle against Huerta and the Federal Army; after fighting battle in the Fort, he was commissioned to buy weapons in the United States-Mexico border; even though he had a fractured arm, he also undertook the task of repairing guns and arms in his smelting factory. To all these activities, Siller added his participation in the political and administrative life of Nuevo León. Thus, already in 1912 he had been named chief of Monterrey's City council. Later, and with his personal budget, he founded and presided over the Progressive Constitutional Party, platform by means of which impelled the campaign for governor of Nicéforo Zambrano that obtained the triumph. Substitute mayor in 1917 and the following year proprietary municipal president of Monterrey, in 1925 Siller was appointed temporary governor replacing Porfirio G. González that had been under riot act. The 16 September 1927 he rendered his last government report and the following month gave the power to Aarón Sáenz Garza.

== Torreón ==
Some of the politic activities of Jerónimo Siller were firstly with the Gral. Guerrero, later in the campaign of the Gen. Fortunato Zuazua, Juan Gutiérrez, Gen. Jesús Gutiérrez Garza, and with the Gen. Juan Andrew Almazán, of whom was personal friend by many years, and during the Escobarista Revolution, Mr. Jerónimo Siller was senator, and the Gen. Almazán designated him as general supplier of his military column, with seat in the city of Torreón, Coahuila.

Siller died in Monterrey, on 14 March 1962.
