= Battle of Calpulalpan =

1860 battle of the Mexican Reform War

- Part of the Reform War
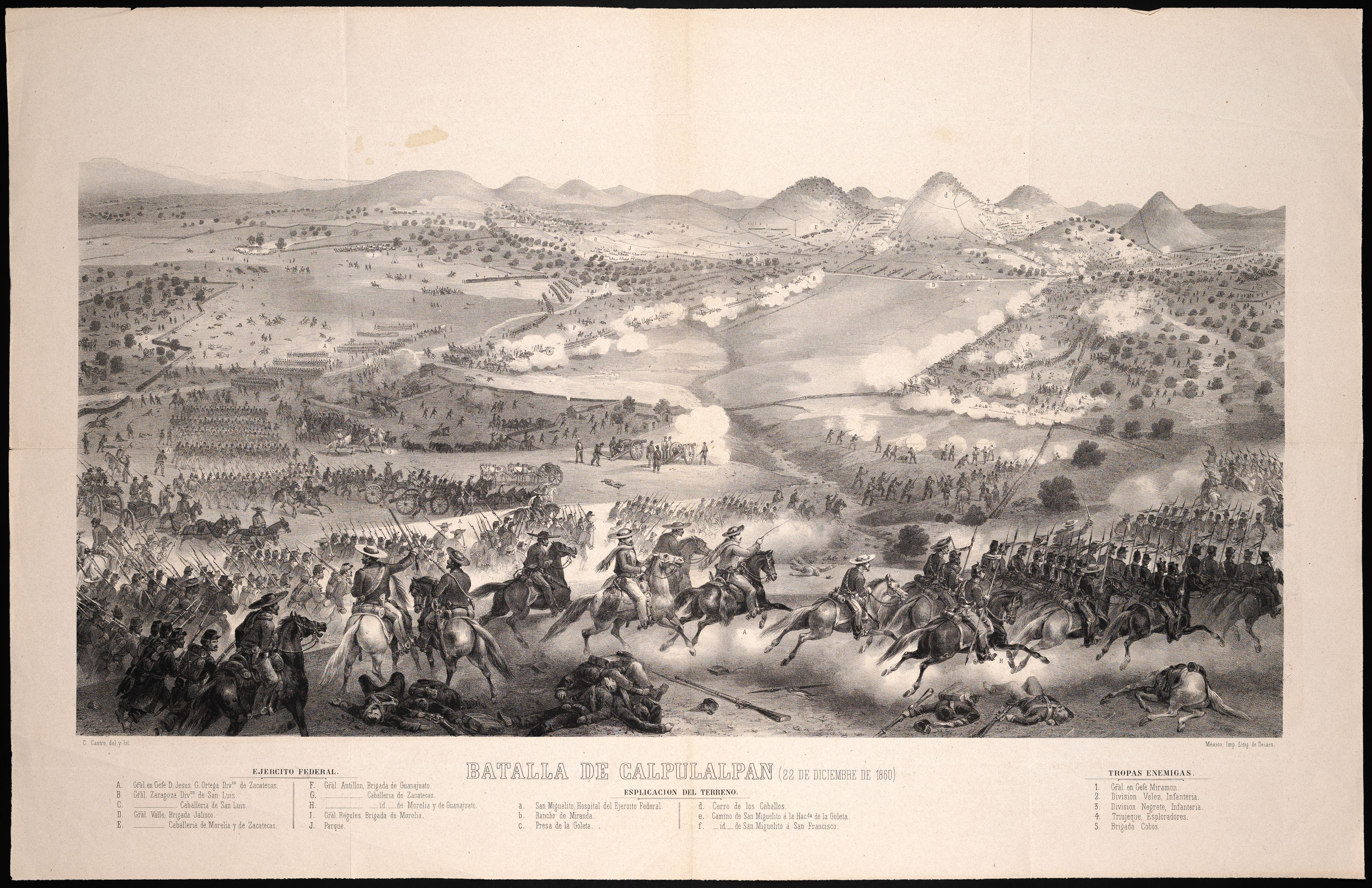
Date	22 December 1860
Location	San Miguel de la Victoria, State of Mexico
Result	Decisive Liberal victory

Belligerents
Liberals	Conservatives

Commanders and leaders
Jesús González Ortega	Miguel Miramón

Strength
11,000; 14 guns	8,000; 30 guns

The Battle of Calpulalpan took place on 22 December 1860 during the War of Reform in the vicinity of the community of San Miguel de la Victoria in the municipality of Jilotepec de Abasolo in the State of Mexico, Mexico. It was the last battle of the War of Reform (1858–1860).

== Contenders ==
In the first stage of the conflict the balance seemed to tilt in favor of the Conservatives, who had the support of most of the formal army, but gradually the trend was reversing, until in Calpulalpan the conservative party played its last card with its best general, Miguel Miramón, commanding eight thousand soldiers, thirty guns and some of the most experienced officers such as Leonardo Márquez, Francisco A. Vélez, Miguel Negrete and Marcelino Cobos.

The Liberal army troops were led by General Jesús González Ortega who had General Ignacio Zaragoza, Leandro Valle, Nicolás Régules and Francisco Alatorre with a force of 11,000 men and 14 pieces of artillery under his command. His army was formed by the republican guerrillas who had risen against the coup three years ago and, despite most not having military education, were hardened soldiers in the battlefields.

== Background ==
After the conquest of Guadalajara on 3 November 1860 the Liberals seized the military initiative. They began to gain territories heading toward the capital. To stop the advance of the enemy, General Miramón left Mexico City but was constantly harassed by the Liberal guerrillas operating around the city. General González Ortega advanced to meet him with 20,000 men.

Both armies met in Calpulalpan on 21 December and, after negotiations failed, prepared for the decisive battle that would determine the war.

== Battle ==
The next day, despite his numerical inferiority, at 8:00 am Miramón began an attack on the Liberal left wing, trying to take advantage of the superiority of his artillery. He was counter-attacked two hours later, by the superior forces of Zaragoza on their own right flank, and by Régules in the middle. At the same time, General González Ortega, Leandro Valle and Alatorre advanced to attack the Conservatives in the rear, in a move that decided the action of arms and the Liberal victory. The Conservative army was completely destroyed. González Ortega pursued the decimated Conservatives at the end of the battle, resulting in a total defeat for the Conservative army.

Miramón escaped and returned to Mexico City in search of support, where he managed to gather 1,500 men, but they soon defected. Knowing that the war was a lost cause, he left the capital and fled toward Veracruz and, days later, to Havana, Cuba, from where he left for France. He would not return until 1863 during the French Intervention.

== Consequences ==
The victory of this battle marked the end of the War of Reform and the disintegration of the Conservative army. On 25 December 1860, General González Ortega made his triumphant return to Mexico City in front of 30,000 troops, thus ending the war with the triumph of the Liberal side. On 5 January President Benito Juárez entered the capital from Veracruz marking the official end of hostilities. However, although they were defeated, Generals Leonardo Márquez and Tomás Mejía continued to resist in some conservative foci. Thus, the secular and republican state prevailed by subjecting the powerful bodies that had previously determined the country's direction: the Church and the Army.
