= Battle of Silao =

1860 battle of the Mexican Reform War

- Part of the Reform War
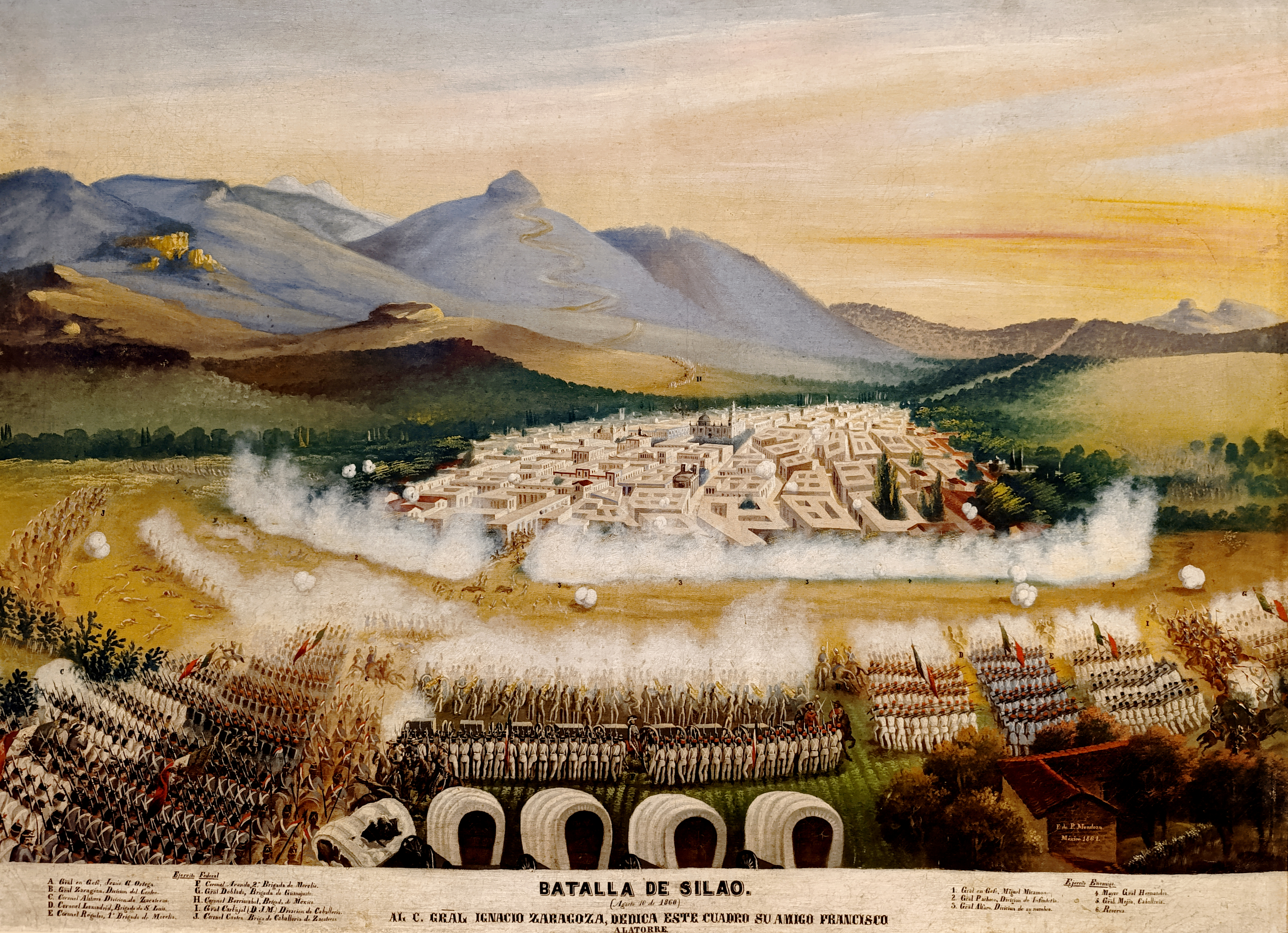
Date	10 August 1860
Location	Silao, Guanajuato
Result	Liberal victory

Belligerents
(Mexico) Liberals	(Mexico) Conservatives

Commanders and leaders
(Mexico) Jesús González Ortega	(Mexico) Miguel Miramón

Strength
8,000; 38 guns	3,282; 18 cannons

Casualties and losses
Unknown	4 generals captured 66 officers captured 2,000 soldiers captured

The Battle of Silao took place on 10 August 1860 in the vicinity of Silao in Guanajuato state, Mexico, between elements of the liberal army, under the command of General Jesús González Ortega and Ignacio Zaragoza with a force of 8,000 men and elements of the conservative army commanded General Miguel Miramón by commanding an army of 3,282 during the War of Reform. The battle was a liberal victory. General Miramón was almost captured, but escaped in the disorder caused by the Republican artillery, abandoning artillery, ammunition and weapons.

== The battle ==
Conservative General Miguel Miramón faced a formidable army of 8,000 men liberals, commanded by General González Ortega, Antillon, Zaragoza, Bending and Berriozábal. Miramón marched had a force of only 3,282 soldiers rookies. Despite the numerical superiority of the liberals, Miramón moved his troops to Silao where the Liberals were encamped.

The battle commenced at the break the dawn of August 10. Miramón's artillery opened large gaps in the path of Loma. González Ortega was able to conceal his maneuvers while Miramón had to rest his soldiers after two hours of fighting and the terrible fire of the powerful liberal artillery. At 8:15 am, after 3 hours of tremendous attacks the conservative army fled, completely defeated and abandoned all their artillery, baggage, ammunition and military equipment to the Liberals as well as a large number of prisoners, including several generals. Miramón was pursued by the victors but escaped.

"After a hard-fought battle in which ha Mexican blood flowed profusely, D. Miguel Miramón was defeated by the forces under my command, leaving in my hands an immense train of artillery, weapons, ammunition, flags, bodies and hundreds of prisoners, a few generals and many officers. The battle began at dawn and ended at eight or nine ".

Miramón said that "the liberal artillery, served by American gunners had won the battle." Liberal troops occupied Silao, Querétaro, Celaya and Guanajuato.
