= Battle of Ahualulco =

1858 battle in Mexico's War of Reform

- Part of the Reform War
Date	29 September 1858
Location	Ahualulco, San Luis Potosí
Result	Conservative victory

Belligerents
(Mexico) Liberals	(Mexico) Conservatives

Commanders and leaders
Santiago Vidaurri; Juan Zuazua; Francisco Naranjo	Miguel Miramón; Leonardo Márquez

Strength
2,970; 6 cannons	1,957; 17 cannons

Casualties and losses
763: 672 killed 91 captured	502: 380 killed 122 wounded

The Battle of Ahualulco took place on 29 September 1858 during the War of Reform, near the town of Ahualulco in the state of San Luis Potosí, Mexico, between elements of the liberal army, commanded by the Generals Santiago Vidaurri, Juan Zuazua and Francisco Naranjo and conservative army troops commanded by General Miguel Miramón and Leonardo Márquez. Vidaurri's army was defeated and the conservatives won the battle as the result. The liberals suffered 672 casualties and 91 prisoners. It is considered by some to be one of the most brilliant triumphs of Miramón.

== Sourcing ==
- Clodfelter, Micheal (2016). Warfare and Armed Conflicts: A Statistical Encyclopedia of Casualty and Other Figures, 1492–2015 (4th ed.). Jefferson: McFarland & Company, Inc., Publishers. ISBN 9781476625850.
- McDonald, Thomas O. (2021). Texas Rangers, Ranchers, and Realtors: James Hughes Callahan and the Day Family in the Guadalupe River Basin. University of Oklahoma Press. ISBN 9780806169941.
