= Miguel Miramón =

President of Mexico from 1859 to 1860

Miguel Miramón y Tarelo
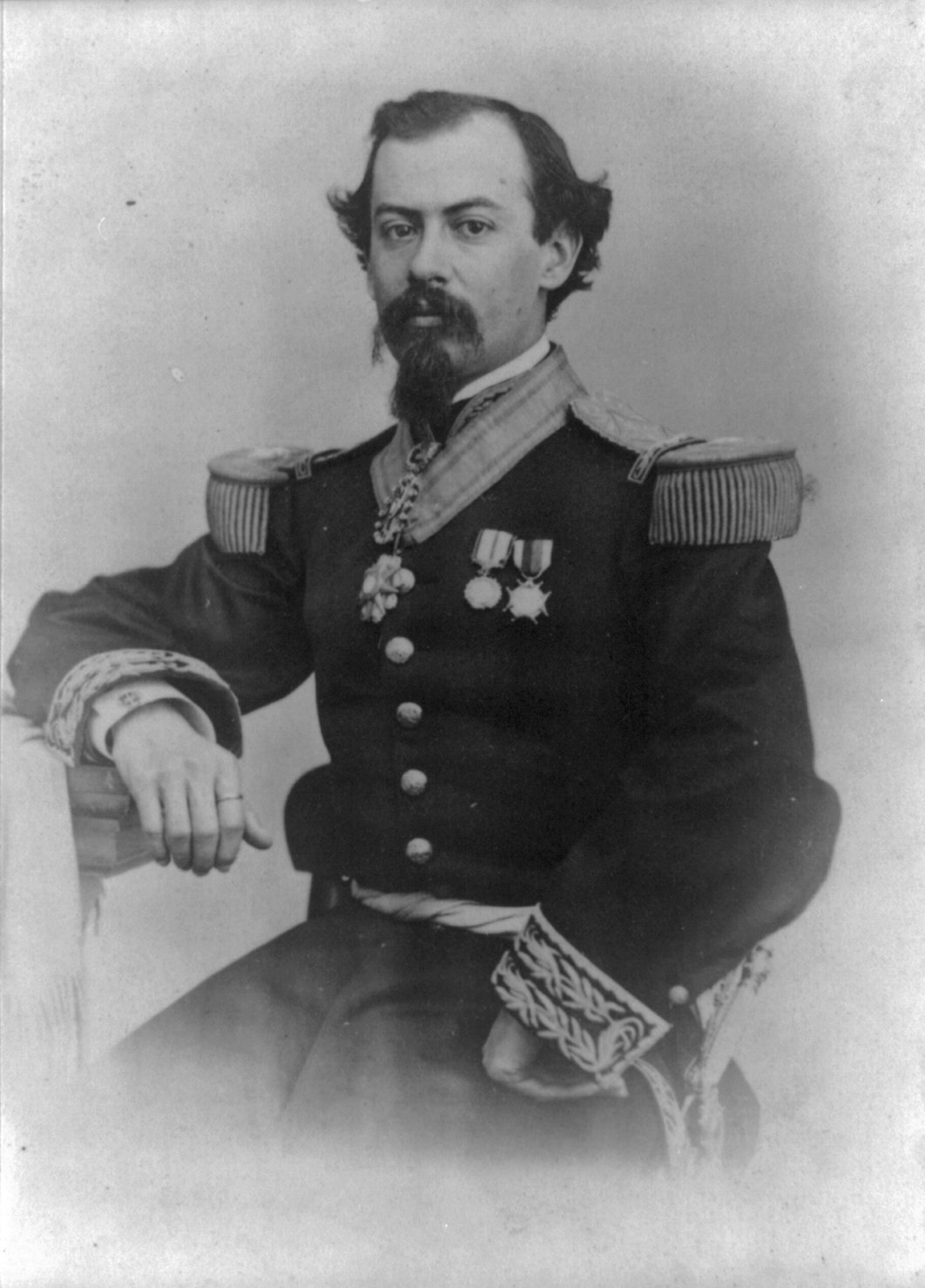

29th President of Mexico by the Plan of Tacubaya
- In office 2 February 1859 – 13 August 1860
- Preceded by: José Mariano Salas
- Succeeded by: José Ignacio Pavón
- In office 15 August 1860 – 24 December 1860
- Preceded by: José Ignacio Pavón
- Succeeded by: Félix Zuloaga

Personal details
- Born: 29 September 1831 Mexico City
- Died: 19 June 1867 (aged 35) Santiago de Querétaro, Querétaro
- Cause of death: Execution (by firing squad)
- Resting place: Panteón de San Fernando, Mexico City later transferred to Puebla Cathedral
- Party: Conservative
- Spouse: Concepción Lombardo
- Education: Heroic Military Academy

Military service
- Allegiance: (Mexico) Conservatives (Mexico) Imperialists
- Battles/wars: Mexican-American War: Battle of Chapultepec (POW); Battle of Molino del Rey; Plan of Ayutla; Three Years' War; Battle of Salamanca; Battle of Atenquique; Battle of Ahualulco; Battle of Guadalajara (1858); Battle of San Joaquín; Battle of Tacubaya; Battle of Silao; Battle of Calpulalpan; French Intervention: Battle of Miahuatlán; Battle of San Jacinto; Siege of Querétaro (executed)

Miguel Gregorio de la Luz Atenógenes Miramón y Tarelo, known as Miguel Miramón (29 September 1831 – 19 June 1867), was a Mexican conservative general who disputed the Mexican presidency with Benito Juárez at the age of 27 during the Reform War, serving between February 1859 and December 1860. He was the first Mexican president to be born after the Mexican War of Independence.

A cadet in military school at the beginning of the Mexican–American War, Miramón saw action at the Battle of Molino del Rey and the Battle of Chapultepec during the American invasion of Mexico City. After the triumph of the liberal Plan of Ayutla in 1855, Miramón participated in a series of conservative counter coups until his efforts merged with the wider Reform War led by conservative president Félix María Zuloaga. The first year of the war was marked by a series of conservative victories achieved by Miramón, leading the press to dub him "Young Maccabee". After a moderate faction of conservatives overthrew Zuloaga in an effort to reach a compromise with liberals, a conservative junta of representatives elected Miramón as president. Miramón led the conservatives for the rest of the war, leading two sieges against the liberal capital of Veracruz, where Benito Juárez maintained his role as president of the Second Federal Republic. The second siege failed after Miramón's naval forces were intercepted by the United States Navy; and liberal victories accumulated hereafter, ending the war in 1860. Miramón escaped the country and went into exile in Europe, where he was received at the Spanish court.

He returned to Mexico in 1862 during the early stages of the Second French intervention, offering his assistance to the Second Mexican Empire. Emperor Maximilian was a liberal and in order to diffuse conservative opposition to the Empire, he sent Miramón to Prussia, ostensibly to study military tactics. As the Empire began to falter, Miramón returned to Mexico, and joined Maximilian until the fall of the Second Mexican Empire in May 1867. The restored Mexican government had Miramón, Maximilian and Tomás Mejía court martialed and sentenced to death. They were shot on 19 June 1867.

== Early life ==
Miramón was born in Mexico City on 29 September 1831, into a very traditional family of partial French heritage. His grandfather was from the province of Béarn. He was the son of Colonel Bernardo de Miramón and his wife Carmen Tarelo. He was one of twelve children and enrolled in the military college on 10 February 1846. The Mexican–American War broke out a few months later. As the Americans entered Mexico City, Miramón himself would join the fighting and during the first weeks of September in 1847, he saw action at the Battle of Molino del Rey and the Battle of Chapultepec, being wounded and being taken prisoner during the latter. He was released in June 1848 after the war had ended.

In military school he went through the regular grades of promotion, from corporal to lieutenant of artillery. In 1852 he served in Jalisco, and in 1853 was in some actions under generals Mariano Salas and Rosas Landa in the department of Mexico. After that he saw much active service, and rose rapidly through the ranks, being made a brevet lieutenant colonel on 6 July 1855, and on the 30th of the same month a fully commissioned lieutenant colonel.

== La Reforma ==
During the period of La Reforma, Miramón participated in the various conservative counter revolutions after the triumph of the liberal Plan of Ayutla in 1855. He joined Antonio de Haro y Tamariz at Zacapoaxtla in 1856, fighting at the head of the 10th and 11th battalions at the Loma de Montero. He saw action at the goteras de Puebla on 10 March, but went into hiding when the city fell.

In October 1856, he was second in command of a conservative revolt proclaimed at Puebla. With a thousand soldiers, he defended the city for 43 days against an army of 6,000 men, causing great damage to the liberal forces. When the city finally fell Miramón refused to surrender and instead at the head of 150 men fled and took the city of Toluca on 18 January 1857, seizing some artillery and then heading to the town of Temascaltepec where he was wounded and defeated. He was imprisoned, but escaped in September, soon after joining the reactionary forces in the South. As second in command, he captured the city of Cuernavaca and in January 1858 to Mexico City where the Plan of Tacubaya led by Félix María Zuloaga had overthrown the liberal government of Ignacio Comonfort, also inaugurating what came to be known as the Reform War.

== Reform War ==
=== Early role ===
Miramón played a key role in the initial offensive, and the series of conservative victories that occurred during 1858. On 10 March 1858, Miramón was a commander at the Battle of Salamanca, which opened up the interior of the country to the conservatives.

On 24 July, Miramón and Tomas Mejía captured Guanajuato, and they captured San Luis Potosí 12 September. The liberal commander of the north, Santiago Vidaurri was then defeated by them at the Battle of Ahualulco on 29 September. By October the conservatives were at the height of their strength.

On 20 December 1858, about a year since he first came to power, Zuloaga had to face a pronunciamiento against himself led by a moderate faction of the conservatives who wished to compromise with the liberal government. Miguel María de Echegaray pronounced at Ayotla with a plan to summon a congress to frame a constitution suitable for the nation. Zuloaga passed measures to put down the revolt, assuming personal command of the forces at the capital, and forbidding all interaction with the rebels. He passed a manifesto condemning Echeagaray who was stripped of his post in the army. Manuel Doblado was also arrested.

A modified form of the Ayotla Plan was proclaimed by Manuel Robles Pezuela on 23 December, and found some military support in the capital. Zuloaga offered to resign if the objection was to him personally, but would not assent if the plan was meant to overthrow his conservative principles. Miramón was offered command of the plan, but he rejected it.

The Plan of Ayotla was actually an offshoot of the aforementioned fusionist party, a moderate faction, which did not seek to abandon conservative principles, but did seek an end to the war by seeking compromise with the liberals. Manuel Robles Pezuela arrived at the national palace on the morning of 24 December, when he assumed the presidency.

Robles Pezuela sent commissioners out to gain adherence to his plan, and began to assemble a junta of representatives ignoring, however the conservative hero Miguel Miramón, upsetting conservative hardliners. Robles, however eventually conceded in granting Miramón representation.

The Junta assembled on 30 December 1858, and proceeded to elect a president. Miramón won with 50 votes against Robles's 46, though the latter was authorized to act as provisional president until Miramón arrived in the capital.

Meanwhile, Zuloaga still claiming the presidency, agreed to officially pass on the presidency to Miramón on 31 January 1859. To keep him from changing his mind, Miramón had him sent to the interior.

=== Presidency ===
Miramón's most important military priority was now the capture of Veracruz. He left the capital on 16 February, leading his troops in person along with his minister of war. Meanwhile, Aguascalientes and Guanajuato had fallen to the liberals. Liberal troops in the West were led by Santos Degollado and headquartered in Morelia, which now served as a liberal arsenal. The conservatives meanwhile, feeling the effects of the malarial climate, abandoned the siege of Veracruz by 29 March. Degollado made another attempt on Mexico City in early April and was utterly routed at the Battle of Tacubaya by Leonardo Márquez, who captured a large amount of war material, and who also in this battle gained infamy for including medics among those executed in the aftermath of the battle.

On 6 April, the Juárez government was recognized by the United States, and on 12 July, the liberal government nationalized the property of the church, and suppressed the monasteries, the sale of which provided the liberal war effort with new funds, though not as much as had been hoped for since speculators were waiting for more stable times to make purchases.

Miramón met the liberal forces in November at which a truce was declared and a conference was held on the matter of the Constitution of 1857 and the possibility of a constituent congress. Negotiations broke down, however and hostilities resumed on the 12th after which Degollado was routed at the Battle of Las Vacas.

On 14 December 1859, the Juárez government signed the McLane–Ocampo Treaty, which granted the U.S. perpetual rights to transport goods across three key trade routes in Mexico, including troops, and granted Americans an element of extraterritoriality. The treaty caused consternation among the conservatives, the European press, and members of Juárez's cabinet; however, the issue was rendered moot when the U.S. Senate failed to approve the treaty.

Meanwhile, Miramón was preparing another siege of Veracruz, heading out of the capital on 8 February, once again leading his troops in person along with his war minister, hoping to rendezvous with a small naval squadron led by the Mexican General Tomás Marín Sabalza, and disembarking from Havana. The United States Navy however had orders to intercept it.

Miramón arrived at Medellín on 2 March, and awaited for Marín's attack in order to begin the siege. The American steamer Indianola however had anchored itself near the fortress of San Juan de Ulúa, in order to defend Veracruz from attack.

On 6 March, Marín's squadron, composed of the General Miramón and the Marques de la Habana, arrived in Veracruz, and was captured by Captain Jarvis of the U.S. Navy in the Battle of Antón Lizardo. The ships were sent to New Orleans, along with the now imprisoned General Marín, depriving the conservatives of an attacking force and the substantial amount of artillery, guns, and rations that they were carrying on board for delivery to Miramón.

Miramón's effort to siege Veracruz was abandoned on 20 March, and he arrived back in the capital on 7 April. The conservatives had also been suffering defeats in the interior losing Aguascalients and San Luis Potosí before the end of April. Degollado was sent into the interior to lead the liberal campaign as their enemies now ran out of resources. He appointed Uraga as Quartermaster General.

Uraga split his troops and attempted to lure Miramón out strategically to isolate him, however On late May however, Uraga then committed the strategic blunder of attempting to assault Guadalajara with Miramón's troops behind him. The assault failed and Uraga was taken prisoner.

Miramón was routed however, on 10 August, in Silao, which resulted in his commander Tomas Mejía being taken prisoner, and Miramón retreated to Mexico City. In response to the disaster, Miramón resigned as president, but the conservative junta only elected him president again after a two days interregnum.

By the end of August, liberals were preparing for a decisive final battle. The capital was cut off from the rest of the country. Guadalajara was surrounded by 17,000 liberal troops while the conservatives in the city only had 7000. The conservative commander Castillo surrendered without firing a shot, and was allowed to leave the city with his troops. Meanwhile, Leonardo Márquez was routed on 10 November, attempting to reinforce Castillo without being aware of his surrender.

Miramón on 3 November convoked a war council including prominent citizens to meet the crisis and by 5 November it was resolved to fight until the end. The conservatives were now struggling with a shortage of funds, and increasing defections. Nonetheless, Miramón gained a victory when he attacked the liberal headquarters of Toluca on 9 December, in which almost all of their forces were captured.

General Jesús González Ortega, however, approached the capital with reinforcements. The decisive Battle of Calpulalpan took place on 22 December, at San Miguel Calpulalpan. The conservatives had 8,000 troops and the liberals 16,000. Miramón lost and retreated back towards the capital.

Another war council now agreed to surrender. The conservative government fled the city, and Miramón intending to head towards the coast and Márquez escaped into the mountains of Michoacán. The triumphant liberals entered the city with 25,000 troops on 1 January 1861, and Juárez entered the capital at 11 January.

== Second Mexican Empire ==
On his way to the coast Miramón was intercepted at the town of Xico, Veracruz, near Xalapa, but he was saved by chance while two of his companions, Díaz and Ordóñez, fell into the hands of the liberals. Miramón hid in Jalapa and later left to Europe on board the French steamer Le Mercure. In response to Miramón's financial raids on British citizens during the war, the British government complained to the French government. Juárez also sought Miramón's arrest. On 2 December 1861, Miramón was received and honored at the Spanish court.

He did not remain long in Europe, and returned during the Tripartite Expedition of French, Spanish, and English forces. He was hardly received warmly by the expeditionary forces, who at this point were simply on a debt collection mission with no intention of upending the Juárez government, and the English representative Dunlop had Miramón arrested and exiled to Cuba, prohibiting Miramón from returning to Mexico.

The tripartite coalition however fell apart, once it became clear that France unilaterally intended to overthrow the Mexican government and organize a client state with the help of conservative collaborators like Juan Almonte. The French entered the capital on 10 June 1863. On 16 June the French government nominated 35 Mexican citizens to constitute a Junta Superior de Gobierno who were then tasked with electing a triumvirate that were to serve as the executive of the new government. The three elected were Juan Almonte, Archbishop Labastida, and José Mariano Salas. The Junta was also to choose 215 Mexican citizens who together with the Junta Superior were to constitute an Assembly of Notables that was to decide upon the form of government. On 11 July, the Assembly published its resolutions, that Mexico was to be a constitutional monarchy and that Ferdinand Maximilian of Habsburg was to be invited to accept the Mexican throne. The executive was then officially changed into the Regency of the Mexican Empire.

It was at this point that Miramón successfully reentered the country by way of the northern frontier, arriving in Mexico City on 28 July 1863, and offering his services to the regency. Maximilian accepted the throne of Mexico in April 1864, and arrived in the nation about a month later. Ironically, given the conservatives' role in bringing him to power, Maximilian was a liberal, who believed in accepting the progressive laws over which the Reform War had been fought over, and in order to neuter conservative opposition to this, he sent his conservative generals out of the country including Miramón who was sent to Berlin in order to study the organization of the Prussian Army.

Miramón only returned to Mexico on 9 November 1866, when the Empire was already faltering. There were rumors that Maximilian was going to abdicate and leave the nation, and Miramón considered putting himself at the head of the conservative armies as he had been during the Reform War, but when Miramón arrived, Maximilian was still in power, and deciding to remain loyal to the Empire, Miramón offered him his services. He advised Maximilian not to abdicate, and offered to fight for him, even at the cost of his life.

After a council at Orizaba which decided against his abdication, Maximilian intended to return to Mexico City, first remaining at Puebla for nearly three weeks, and making preparations for the campaign. The country was divided into three great military districts the western, comprising the provinces north of Colima, including Durango and Chihuahua; the eastern, stretching from Aguascalientes and Tampico northward; and the central, embracing all the vast remainder to Chiapas. Miramón, who took command of the western district, had already set out to create his army, with little regard for the means to be employed, but Mejía in the east stood at the head of nearly 4,000 men; and Márquez, controlling the centre, had 4,000 under Méndez in Michoacan, and fully 2,000 at Puebla, Maximilian assumed the supreme command, and issued orders for the active formation of the new national army as well as militia.

Unfortunately for the Empire, the Western and Eastern military district were in possession of the Republicans, as well as the region south of Puebla, while the few remaining central provinces were overrun by hostile bands and about to be invaded by the Republican armies. Funds and resources were also lacking. Meanwhile, arms and funds from the United States were pouring into the Republic armies.

On 27 January 1867, Miramón triumphantly captured Aguascalientes and nearly succeeded in capturing Juárez, the retreat of Governor Auza managing to save him. Miramón however, did not intend to advance any further, satisfied with the forced loan and the diversion he had created among the Republicans, he retired to join Castillo at San Luis Potosí. The Republican general Mariano Escobedo figured out his intentions and intercepted him at San Jacinto at 1 February, leading to a complete rout. Miramón escaped with Castillo and took refuge in Querétaro. The Republicans had by then captured Guanajuato, and then Morelia. The Imperialists retreated from Michoacán to the borders of San Luis Potosí and fell back upon Querétaro.

=== Siege of Queretaro ===
Maximilian joined the army at Querétaro along with Minister Aguirre, Leonardo Márquez, and López with the sum of fifty thousand pesos, with sixteen hundred men and twelve cannons. Maximilian reached Querétaro on 19 February, and was received by enthusiasm with Miramón and the other generals meeting him at a formal reception.

A few days after their arrival a review of the troops was held, showing 9,000 men with 39 cannon, including about 600 Frenchmen, Miramón was placed at the head of the infantry, of which Castillo and Casanova received each a division, Méndez assuming command of the reserve brigade, in which López served as colonel, Mejía became chief of the cavalry, Reyes of engineers, and Arellano of the artillery. Márquez was accorded the foremost place, as chief of the general staff, greatly to the anger of Miramón. Maximilian, Miramón, Márquez, Mejía, and Méndez became known as "the five magic M's" of the Empire.

In the first council of war that had been held on 22 February, it had been agreed to fight the Republicans at once, before their combined forces became too strong, but ultimately this strategy, which historian Bancroft suggests could have achieved victory, was rejected at the behest of Márquez. As the liberals began to surround Querétaro, Márquez then suggested to flee to Mexico City, still held by the Imperialists, gather their forces and face the liberal armies in one final decisive battle, but this was deemed as impractical.

On 5 March, the Republican forces came into view of the defenders at Querétaro, and began to prepare for a siege. After the fighting had begun Márquez once again brought up his plan of retreating to Mexico, but Miramón and others strongly opposed him. Miramón planned to lead a counterattack to recover the hill of San Gregorio on 17 March. When the time arrived however, a false alarm arose that the Imperialist headquarters were under attack, leading the counterattack to be put off.

Miramón now placed his support for a plan to destroy the Western besieging lines therefore providing a way to retreat if needed. Márquez was assigned to go to Mexico City to seek reinforcements. Miramón was assigned to provide a distraction and on 22 March he led an expedition down the valley, which captured a quantity of provisions. Márquez was able to depart during the night with 1200 horsemen and Miramón now became the leading general at Querétaro.

After the Imperialists repulsed another Republican assault, leaving the latter with 2000 deaths, Miramón, during an award ceremony, took one of the medals and asked to decorate the Emperor for his conduct during the battle, which Maximilian accepted, and wore as the most valued of his decorations.

On 1 April Miramón led a counterattack to the hill of San Gregorio, but lack of reinforcements left the attack without any decisive results.

As any news of Márquez failed to arrive, a mission was sent to Mexico City to see what happened. Miramón urged Maximilian to leave as well but, the latter chose to stay. The mission failed, and now leading officers outright urged surrender.

The Imperialists now planned to fight their way out of Querétaro, and as preparation Miramón planned an attack on Cimatario Hill on 27 April, to which he advanced with 2000 men. The Imperialist repulsed the Republican forces, dispersing thousands and taking 500 prisoners, but the Imperialists squandered vital time planning their next move, and Republican reserves arrived to provide a defeat.

The Imperialists now sought to break through the enemy lines and seek refuge in the ranges of the Sierra Gorda, and possibly reach the coast. The movement was planned for 15 May.

Unfortunately for the Imperialists, before these plans were carried out they were betrayed by Colonel Miguel López, and on the night of 14 May, he opened the gates of Querétaro to the Republican forces in exchange for a sum of gold.

Surprised by enemy troops at night, Miramón fought back, and he was shot in the face, being carried by friendly forces to the house of a Querétaro physician, Dr. Licea, who then turned Miramón over to the Republicans.

== Court martial and execution ==
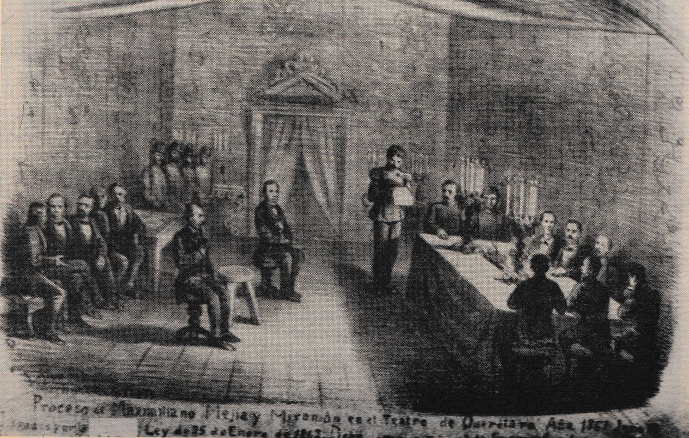
Trial of Maxmilian, Mejía and Miramón in Santiago de Querétaro.

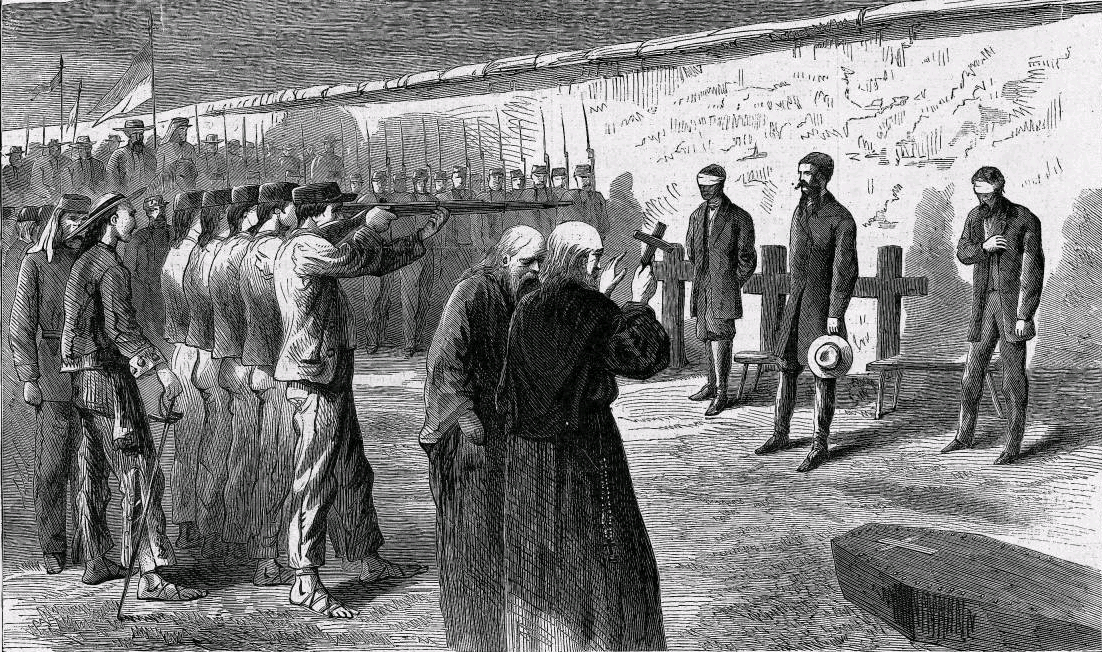
Execution of Maximilian and his generals, 19 June 1867.

Maximilian, Miramón, and Mejía were tried for violating an 1862 Decree passed in the early stages of the French Intervention, against traitors and invaders. The court, with Colonel Rafael Platón Sánchez presiding, issued a unanimous verdict of guilty on the night of 14 June, and a sentence of death was ordered.

Among those who pled President Juárez to spare their lives was Miramón's wife who, weeping with her two children, fainted at the foot of the president. Maximilian wrote to his European relatives asking them to take care of Miramón's wife and her children.

The three condemned were led to the Cerro de las Campanas outside of Querétaro on the morning of 19 June. Miramón and Mejía stood to the side of Maximilian, but the latter then remarked to Miramón that "a brave soldier is respected by his sovereign; permit me to yield to you the place of honor," and Miramón was subsequently given the center position. Before being executed he read a brief piece disavowing the charge of traitor. All three were executed at around seven in the morning.

== See also ==
- List of heads of state of Mexico
