= Reform War =

Civil war within Mexico from 1858 to 1861

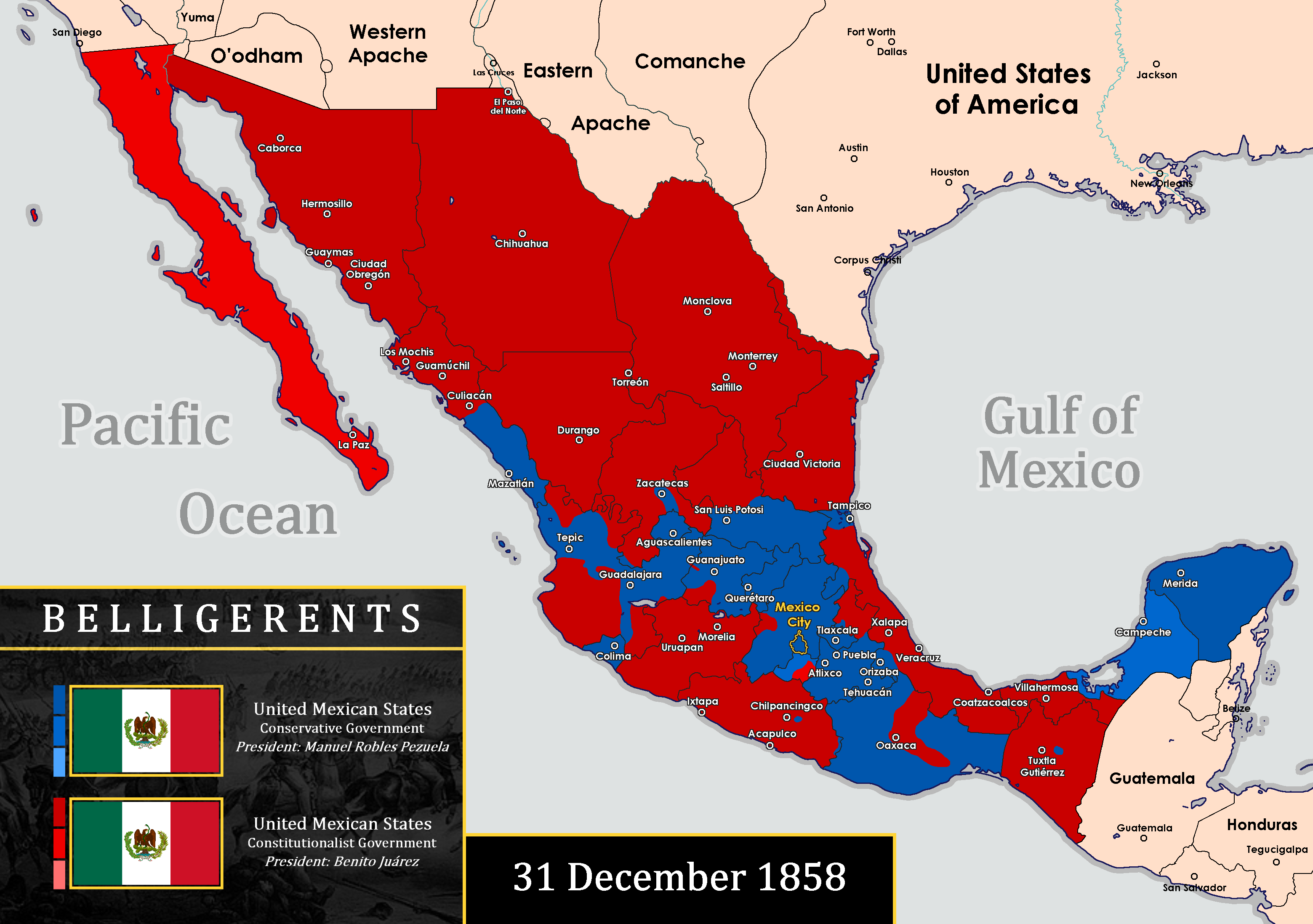
- A frontline map of the Reform War by the end of 1858, depicting the Conservatives (blue) against the Liberals (red).
Date	17 December 1857 – 11 January 1861 (3 years, 3 weeks and 4 days)
Location	Mexico
Result	Liberal victory; Nation's infrastructure and finances are left in ruins, Convention of London is signed by the United Kingdom, Spain, and France to guarantee debt payments; Conservatives collaborate with the French during the subsequent second French intervention in Mexico to establish a monarchy

Belligerents
(Mexico) Liberals; Supported by: United States	(Mexico) Conservatives Supported by: (Kingdom of Spain) Spain

Commanders and leaders
Benito Juárez; Santos Degollado; Ignacio Zaragoza; Santiago Vidaurri; Jesús González Ortega; Emilio Langberg	Félix Zuloaga; Miguel Miramón; Leonardo Márquez; Tomás Mejía; Luis G. Osollo

Strength
(Second Federal Republic of Mexico) 78,570 1,000 Americans	(Mexico) 54,889

Casualties and losses
(Second Federal Republic of Mexico) 8,713; 103 Americans killed by Mexican liberals 4 American soldiers kidnapped in a cross-border raid by Mexican liberals and later executed	(Mexico) 11,355
- 70,000 casualties

The Reform War (17 December 1857 – 11 January 1861) or War of Reform (Spanish: Guerra de Reforma), also known as the Three Years' War (Spanish: Guerra de los Tres Años) and the Mexican Civil War, was a complex civil conflict in Mexico that was fought between Mexican liberals and conservatives with regional variations over the promulgation of the Constitution of 1857. It has been called the "worst civil war to hit Mexico between the War of Independence of 1810–21 and the Revolution of 1910–20." Following the liberals' overthrow of the dictatorship of the conservative Antonio López de Santa Anna, the liberals passed a series of laws that codified their political program that were incorporated into the new constitution. It aimed to limit the political power of the executive branch, as well as the political, economic, and cultural power of the Catholic Church. Specific measures were the expropriation of church property, the separation of church and state, reduction of the power of the Mexican Army by the elimination of its special privileges, the strengthening of the secular state through public educations, and measures to develop the nation economically.

The constitution had been promulgated on February 5, 1857 and was to come into force on September 16, 1857. There was intense opposition from conservatives and the Catholic Church over its anti-clerical provisions, but there were also moderate liberals, including President Ignacio Comonfort, who considered the constitution too radical and likely to trigger a civil war. The Lerdo Law forced the sale of most of the Church's rural properties. The measure was not exclusively aimed at the Catholic Church but also at Mexico's indigenous peoples, who were forced to sell sizable portions of their communal lands. Controversy was further inflamed when the Catholic Church decreed the excommunication of civil servants who took a government-mandated oath upholding the new constitution, which left Catholic civil servants with the choice of either losing their jobs or being excommunicated.

General Félix Zuloaga led army troops to the capital, closed congress, and issued the Plan of Tacubaya on 17 December 1857. The constitution was nullified, and President Comonfort initially agreed to the plan and was retained in the presidency and given emergency powers. Some liberal politicians were arrested, including the president of the Supreme Court of Justice, Benito Juárez. Comonfort, hoping to establish a more moderate government, found himself triggering a civil war and began to back away from Zuloaga. On January 11, 1858, Comonfort resigned and went into exile. He was constitutionally succeeded by Juárez as president of the Supreme Court. The nation's states subsequently chose to side with either the government of Zuloaga, based in Mexico City, or that of Juárez, which established itself at the strategic port of Veracruz. Initial choices for one side or the other often shifted over time. The first year of the war was marked by repeated conservative victories, but the liberals remained entrenched in the nation's coastal regions, including their capital at the port of Veracruz, which gave them access to vital customs revenue to fund their forces.

Both governments attained international recognition, the liberals by the United States and the conservatives by France, the United Kingdom, and Spain. The liberals negotiated the McLane–Ocampo Treaty with the United States in 1859. If ratified, the treaty would have given the liberal regime cash, but it would have also granted the United States perpetual military and economic rights on Mexican territory. The treaty failed to pass in the U.S. Senate, but the U.S. Navy still helped protect Juárez's government in Veracruz.

Liberals accumulated victories on the battlefield until the conservative forces surrendered on 22 December 1860. Juárez returned to Mexico City on January 11, 1861 and held presidential elections in March. Although the conservative forces had lost the war, guerrillas remained active in the countryside and later joined the upcoming French intervention to help establish the Second Mexican Empire.

== Background ==
After achieving independence in 1821, Mexico was alternatively governed by both liberal and conservative coalitions. The original Constitution of 1824 established the federalist system championed by the liberals, with the states holding sovereign power and the central government being weak. The brief liberal administration of Valentín Gómez Farías attempted to implement anti-clerical measures as early as 1833. The government closed church schools, assumed the right to make clerical appointments to the Catholic Church, and shut down monasteries. The ensuing backlash would result in Gómez Farías's government being overthrown, and conservatives established the Centralist Republic in 1835, which lasted until the outbreak of the Mexican–American War in 1846.

In 1854, there was a liberal revolt, known as the Plan of Ayutla, against the dictatorship of Antonio López de Santa Anna. A coalition of liberals, including Oaxaca Governor Benito Juárez and Michoacán Governor Melchor Ocampo overthrew Santa Anna, and the presidency passed to a liberal caudillo, Juan Álvarez, in November 1855.

== La Reforma ==
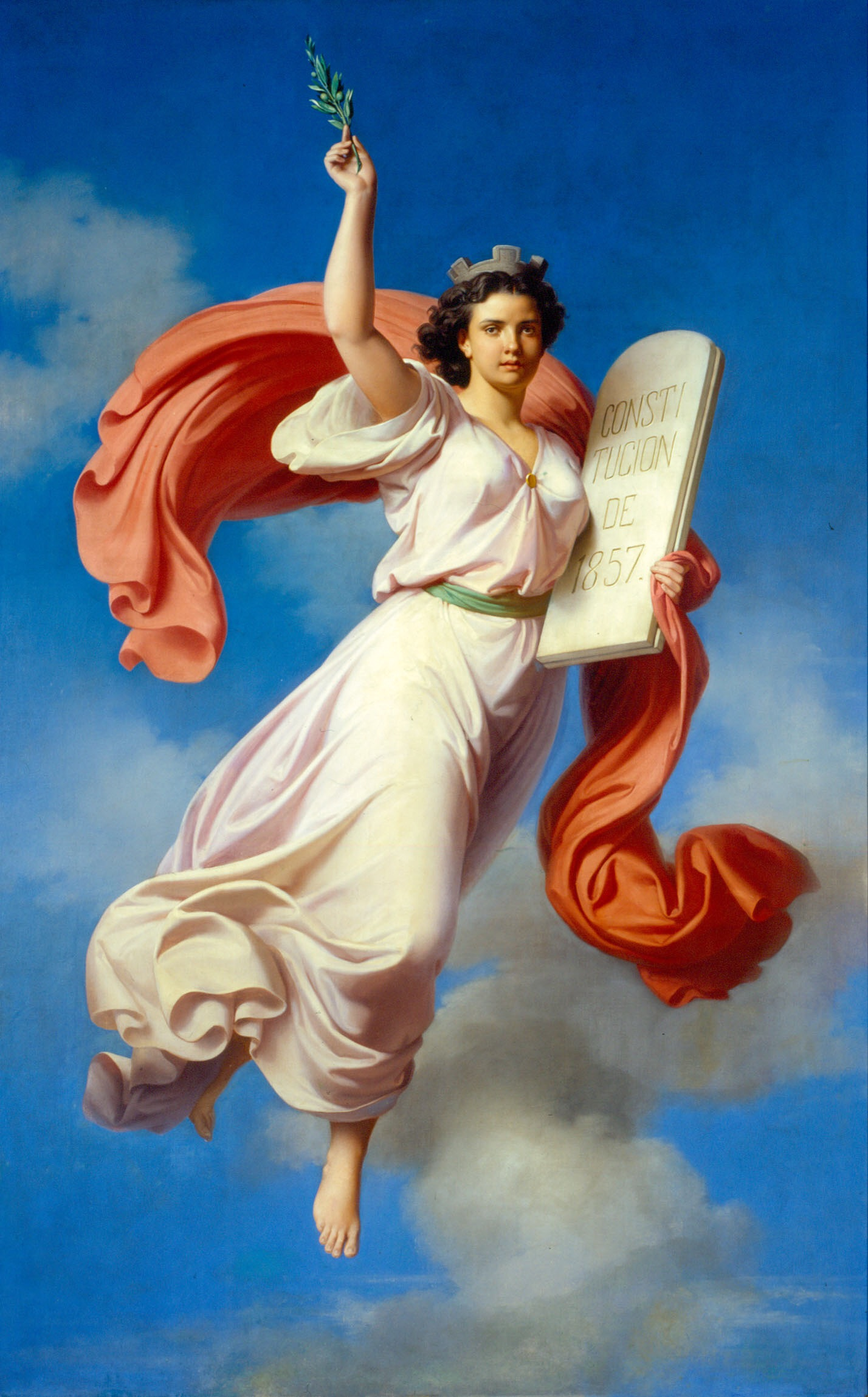
Allegory of the Constitution of 1857, Petronilo Monroy, 1869.

Álvarez's cabinet was radical and included the prominent liberals Benito Juárez, Miguel Lerdo de Tejada, Melchor Ocampo, and Guillermo Prieto but also the more moderate Ignacio Comonfort.

Clashes in the cabinet led to the resignation of the radical Ocampo, but the administration was still determined to pass significant reforms. On 23 November 1855, the Juárez Law, named after the Minister of Justice, substantially reduced the jurisdiction of the military and ecclesiastical courts, which existed for soldiers and clergy.

Further dissension within liberal ranks led to Álvarez's resignation and the more moderate Comonfort becoming president on 11 December and choosing a new cabinet. A constituent congress began meeting on 14 February 1856 and ratified the Juárez Law. In June, another major controversy emerged over the promulgation of the Lerdo Law, named after the secretary of the treasury, Miguel Lerdo de Tejada. The law aimed at disentailing the collective ownership of real estate by the Roman Catholic Church and the Indigenous communities. It forced "civil or ecclesiastical institutions" to sell any land that they owned, with the tenants receiving priority and generous terms for purchasing the community-held land they cultivated. The law sought to undermine the church's economic power and to force create a class of yeoman farmers of indigenous community members.

The law was envisioned as a way to develop Mexico's economy by increasing the number of indigenous private property owners, but in practice, the land was bought up by rich speculators. Most of the former Indigenous communities' lands community increased the size of the large landed estates, the haciendas.

The Constitution of 1857 was promulgated on February 5, 1857, and it incorporated both the Juárez and the Lerdo Laws. It was meant to take into effect on September 16. On March 17, it was decreed that all civil servants had to swear to it publicly and to take an oath to it. The Catholic Church decreed excommunication for anyone that took the oath, and many Catholics in the government lost their jobs for refusing the oath.

Controversy over the constitution continued to rage, and Comonfort himself was rumored to be conspiring to form a new government. On December 17, 1857, General Zuloaga proclaimed the Plan of Tacubaya, declared the Constitution of 1857 nullified, and offered supreme power to President Comonfort, who was to convoke a new constitutional convention to produce a new document more in accord with Mexican interests. In response, congress deposed President Comonfort, but Zuloaga's troops entered the capital on the 18th and dissolved congress. The following day, Comonfort accepted the Plan of Tacubaya and released a manifesto that made the case that more moderate reforms were needed under the current circumstances.

The Plan of Tacubaya did not lead to a national reconciliation, as Comonfort realized, and he began to back away from Zuloaga and the conservatives. He resigned from the presidency and even began to lead skirmishes against the Zuloaga government, but after he had been abandoned by most of his loyal troops, he left the capital on 11 January 1858, with the constitutional presidency having passed to the president of the Supreme Court, Benito Juárez. The conservative government in the capital summoned a council of representatives that elected Zuloaga as president, and the states of Mexico proclaimed their loyalties to either the conservative Zuloaga or the liberal Juárez governments. The Reform War had now begun.

== The War ==
=== Flight of the Liberal Government ===
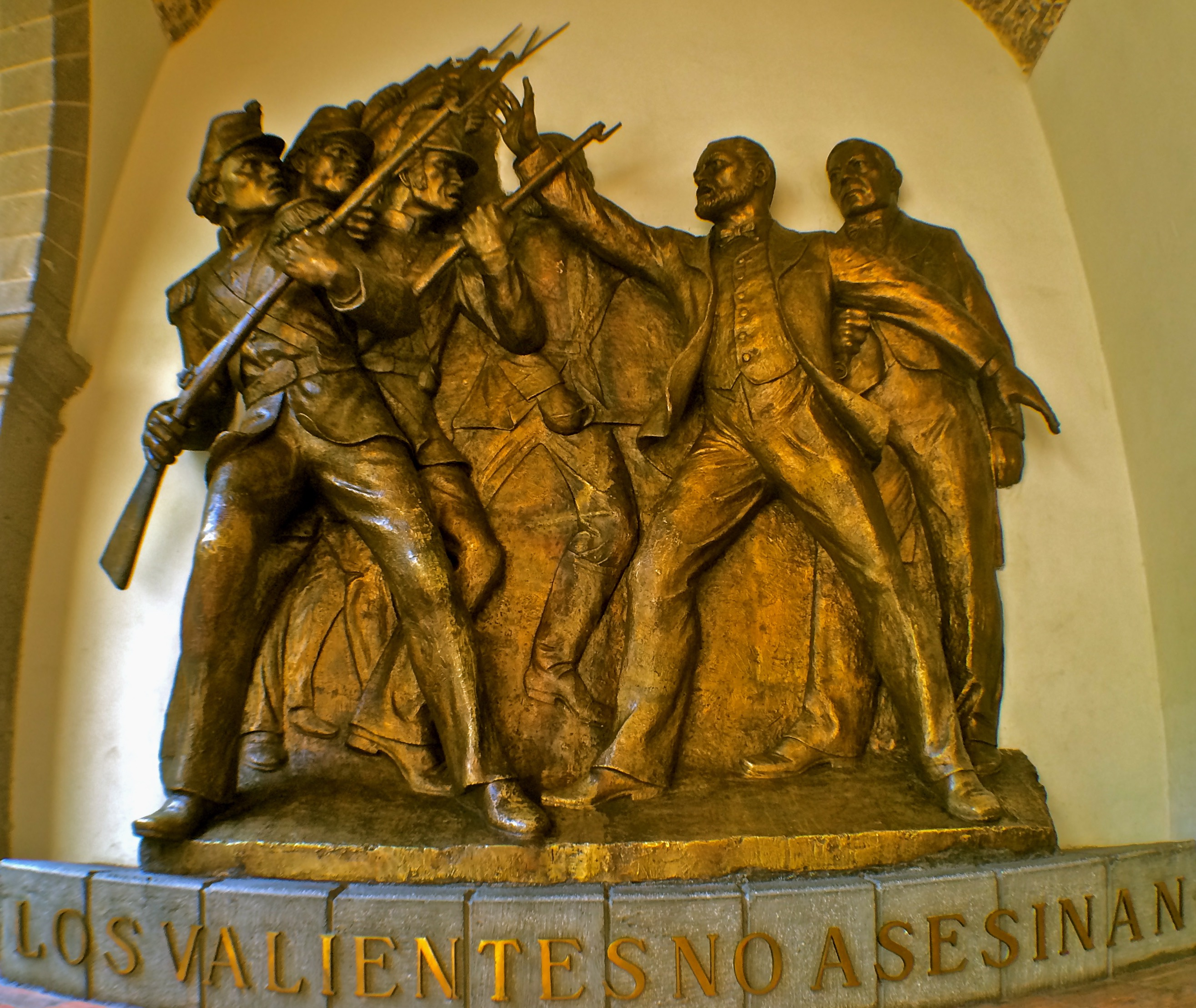
Sculpture portraying Guillermo Prieto saving the life of President Juárez

President Juárez and his ministers fled from Mexico City to Querétaro. General Zuloaga, knowing the strategic importance of the Gulf Coast state of Veracruz, tried to win over its governor, Gutierrez Zamora, but he affirmed his support for Juárez's government. Santiago Vidaurri and Manuel Doblado organized the liberal forces in the north and led a coalition in the interior that was headquartered in the town of Celaya, Guanajuato. On 10 March 1858, liberal forces under Anastasio Parrodi, the governor of Jalisco, and Leandro Valle lost the Battle of Salamanca, which opened up the interior of the country to the conservatives.

Juárez was in Jalisco's capital of Guadalajara, where, from March 13 to 15, part of the army there mutinied and imprisoned him and threatened his life. The liberal minister and fellow prisoner Guillermo Prieto dissuaded the hostile soldiers from shooting Juárez, an event now memorialized by a statue. As rival factions struggled to control the city, Juárez and other liberal prisoners were released on agreement, and Guadalajara hade become fully captured by conservatives by the end of March. The conservatives took the silver mining center of Zacatecas on 12 April. Juárez reconstituted his regime in Veracruz and embarked from the west coast port of Manzanillo. He crossed Panama, arrived in Veracruz on May 4, 1858, and made it the liberal capital.

=== Conservative Advances ===
Juárez made Santos Degollado the head of the liberal armies, which went on to defeat upon defeat. Miramón defeated him in the Battle of Atenquique on July 2. On July 24, Miramón captured Guanajuato, and San Luis Potosi was captured by the conservatives on September 12 . Vidaurri was defeated at the Battle of Ahualulco on September 29. By October, the conservatives were at the height of their strength.

The liberals failed to take Mexico City on October 14, but Santos Degollado captured Guadalajara on October 27; the thirty-day siege had left a third of the city in ruins. The victory caused consternation at the conservative capital, but Guadalajara was taken back by Márquez on December 14.

The failure of Zuloaga's government to produce a constitution actually led to a conservative revolt against him led by General Echegaray. He resigned in favor of Manuel Robles Pezuela on December 23. On December 30, a conservative junta in Mexico City elected General Miguel Miramón as president.

=== First Veracruz Offensive ===
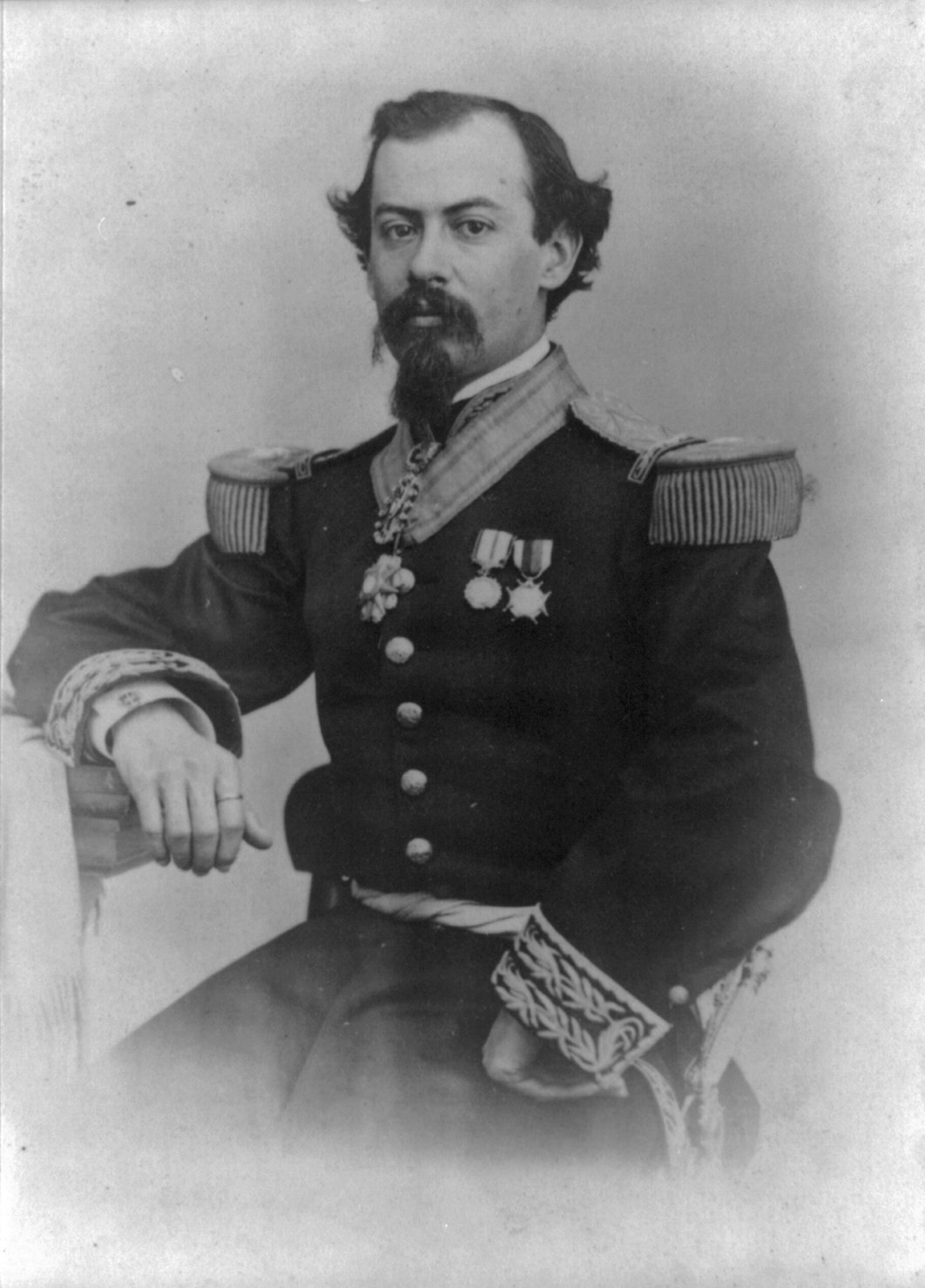
Conservative President Miguel Miramón

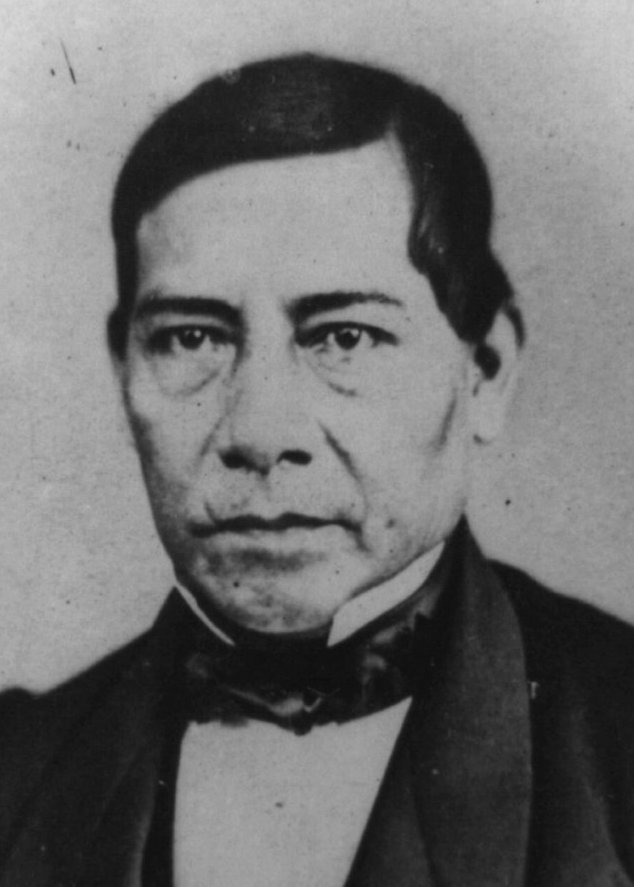
Constitutional President Benito Juárez

President Miramón's most important military priority was now the capture of Veracruz, the liberals' stronghold. He left the capital on February 16 and led the troops in person, along with his minister of war. Aguascalientes and Guanajuato had fallen to the liberals. The liberal troops in the West were led by Degollado and headquartered in Morelia, which now served as a liberal arsenal. The conservatives fell ill with malaria, which was endemic in the Gulf Coast, and abandoned the siege of Veracruz by March 29. Liberal General Degollado made another attempt on Mexico City in early April and was routed at the Battle of Tacubaya by Leonardo Márquez, who captured a large amount of war materiel and gained infamy for including medics among those who were executed in the aftermath of the battle.

On 6 April, the Juárez government was recognized by the United States during James Buchanan's administration. Miramón attempted to besiege Veracruz in June and July. On July 12, the liberal government nationalized the property of the church and suppressed the monasteries and convents, the sale of which provided the liberal war effort with new funds but not less than what had been hoped since speculators were waiting for more stable times to make purchases.

Miramón met the liberal forces in November at which a truce was declared and a conference was held on the matter of the Constitution of 1857 and the possibility of a constituent congress. Negotiations broke down, and hostilities resumed on the 12th. Degollado was later routed at the Battle of Las Vacas.

=== Second Veracruz Offensive ===
On 14 December 1859, Ocampo signed the McLane–Ocampo Treaty, which granted to the United States perpetual rights to transport goods and troops across three key trade routes in Mexico and granted Americans an element of extraterritoriality. The treaty caused consternation among the conservatives and some liberals, the European press, and even members of Juárez's cabinet. The issue was rendered moot when the U.S. Senate failed to approve the treaty.

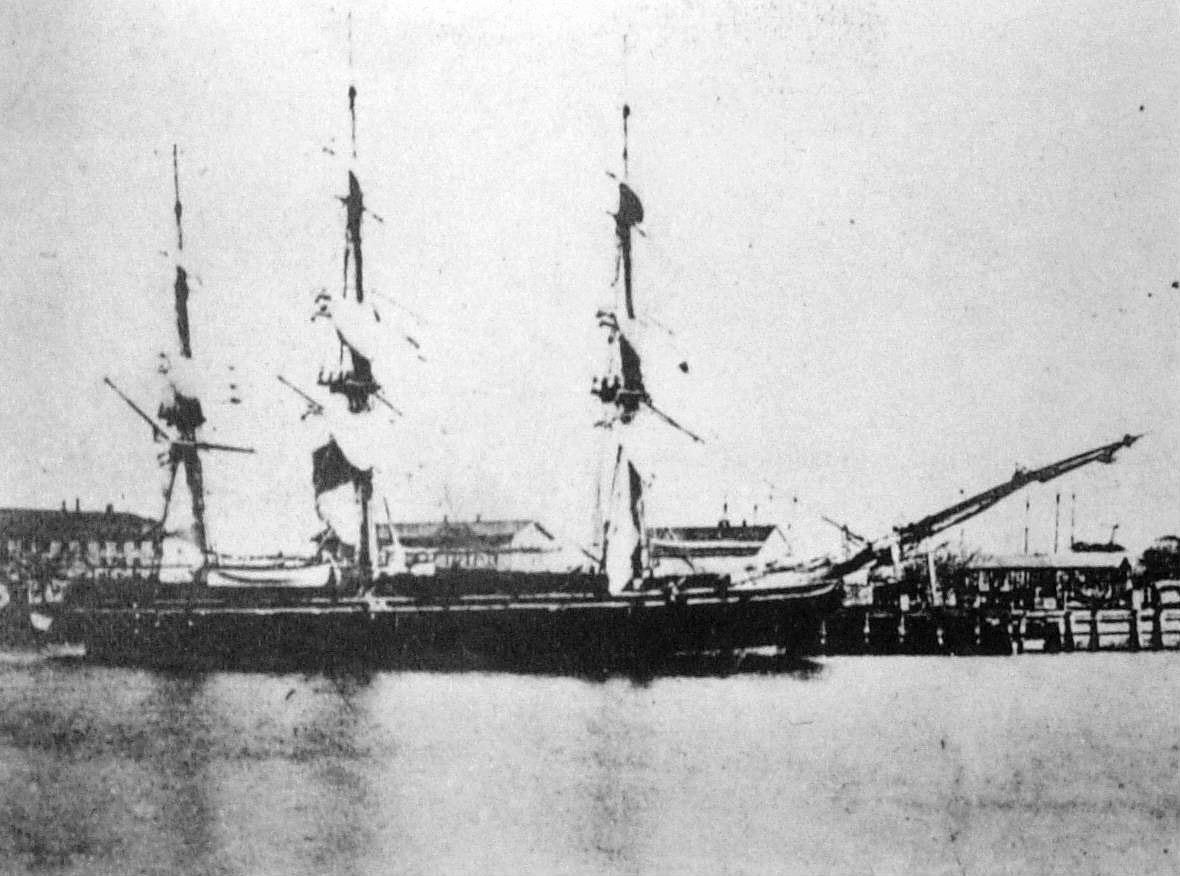
U.S.S. Saratoga, which helped defeat a conservative squadron at the Battle of Antón Lizardo

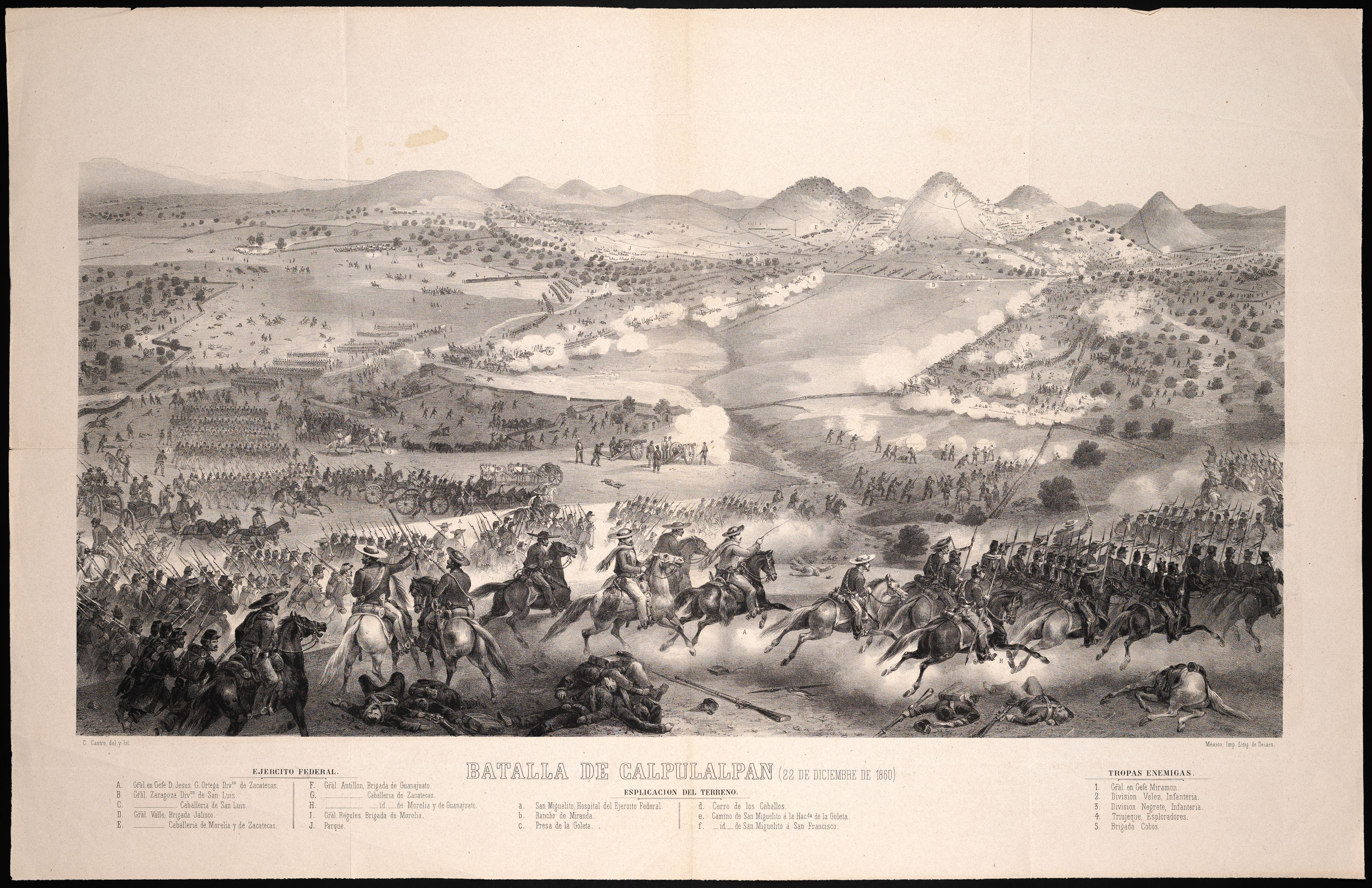
Battle of Calpulalpan, the last battle of the war ending with the liberals prevailing

Miramón was preparing another siege of Veracruz and left the conservative capital of Mexico City on February 8. He led his troops in person, along with his war minister, and hoped to rendezvous with a small naval squadron led by General Tomás Marín, who was disembarking from Havana. The U.S. Navy, however, had orders to intercept it. Miramón arrived at Medellín on March 2 and awaited Marín's attack in order to begin the siege. The U.S. steamer Indianola had been anchored near the fortress of San Juan de Ulúa to defend Veracruz from attack.

On 6 March, Marín's squadron arrived in Veracruz and was captured by U.S. Navy Captain Joseph R. Jarvis in the Battle of Antón Lizardo. The ships were sent to New Orleans, along with the now-imprisoned General Marín, which deprived the conservatives of an attack force and the substantial artillery, guns, and rations that they had carried onboard for delivery to Miramón. Miramón's effort to besiege Veracruz was abandoned on 20 March, and he arrived back in Mexico City on 7 April.

=== Liberal Triumph ===
The conservatives also suffered defeats in the interior by losing Aguascalientes and San Luis Potosí before the end of April. Degollado was sent into the interior to lead the liberal campaign since their enemies had now exhausted their resources. He appointed José López Uraga as quartermaster general Uraga split his troops and attempted to lure out Miramón to isolate him, but in late May, Uraga committed the strategic blunder of attempting to assault Guadalajara with Mirámon's troops behind him. The assault failed, and Uraga was taken prisoner.

Miramón was routed on 10 August at the Battle of Silao in Silao, Guanajuato, which resulted in his commander Tomás Mejía being taken prisoner. Miramón retreated to Mexico City. In response to the disaster, he resigned as president to seek a vote of confidence. The conservative junta elected him president again after a two-day interregnum.

By the end of August, the liberals were preparing for a decisive final battle. Mexico City was cut off from the rest of the country. Guadalajara was surrounded by 17,000 liberal troops, and the conservatives in the city had only 7,000. The conservative commander Castillo surrendered without firing a shot and was allowed to leave the city with his troops. General Leonardo Márquez was routed on 10 November while he was attempting to reinforce General Castillo without being aware of his surrender.

Miramón on November 3 convoked a war council that included prominent citizens to meet the crisis. By November 5, it had resolved to fight to the end. The conservatives were not struggling with a shortage of funds because they had looted the British legation of $700,000, but they had increasing defections. Nonetheless, Miramón gained a victory when he attacked the liberal headquarters of Toluca on 9 December in which almost all of their forces were captured. With the tide turning to liberal victories, Juárez rejected the McLane-Ocampo Treaty in November after the treaty had been rejected in the U.S. Senate on 31 May and not ratified. Juárez had secured recognition from the U.S. government with the opening of negotiations with the United States, rejected outright sale of Mexican territory to the United States, and received aid from the U.S. Navy. In the end, he secured benefits to Mexico without actually concluding the treaty.

In early December, as the tide of war had clearly turned to the liberals, Juárez signed the Law for the Liberty of Religious Worship on 4 December, the final step in the liberals' program to disempower the Catholic Church by allowing religious tolerance in Mexico.

General González Ortega approached Mexico City with reinforcements. The decisive battle took place on December 22 with the Battle of Calpulalpan. The conservatives had 8,000 troops and the liberals 16,000. Miramón lost and retreated towards the capital.

Another conservative war council agreed to surrender. The conservative government fled the city, and Miramón himself escaped to European exile. Márquez escaped to the mountains of Michoacán. The triumphant liberals entered the city with 25,000 troops on January 1, 1861, and Juárez entered the capital on January 11.

== Foreign support ==
After Zuloaga's coup, the conservative government was recognized swiftly by Spain and France. Neither the conservatives nor the liberals ever had official foreign troops as part of their respective armed forces. The conservative government signed the Mon-Almonte Treaty with Spain, which promised to pay the Spanish government indemnities in exchange for aid. The liberals also sought foreign support from the United States. Mexico signed the McLane-Ocampo Treaty, which would have granted to the United States perpetual transit and extraterritorial rights in Mexico. The treaty was denounced by conservatives and some liberals, and Juárez countered that the territorial losses to the United States had occurred under the conservatives. With the liberal victory, Juárez's government was unable to meet foreign debt obligations, some of which stemmed from the Mon-Almonte Treaty. When Juárez's government suspended payments, the pretext was used to inaugurate the Second French Intervention in Mexico.

During the Reform War, as the military stalemate continued, some liberals considered the idea of foreign intervention. The brothers Miguel Lerdo and Sebastián de Tejada were liberal politicians from Veracruz and had commercial connections with the United States. Miguel Lerdo, Juárez's Minister of Finance, attempted to negotiate a loan with the United States. He was reported to despair of Mexico's situation and saw some form of protection from the United States as the way forward and the way to prevent a resurgence of Spanish colonialism. Correspondence between Melchor Ocampo and Santos Degollado that discussed Lerdo's attempt to negotiate a loan was captured and published by conservatives. Degollado was later to advocate mediation through the diplomatic corps in Mexico to end the conflict. Juárez flatly refused Degollado's call to resign and saw that as turning over Mexico's future to European powers.

== Aftermath ==
A French invasion and the establishment of the Second Mexican Empire followed almost immediately after the end of the Reform War, and key figures of the war would continue to play roles during its rise and fall.

While the main fighting in the Reform War was over by the end of 1860, guerillas continued to be waged in the countryside. After the fall of the conservative government, General Leonardo Márquez remained at large and in June 1861 succeeded in assassinating Ocampo. President Juárez sent the former head of his troops during the Reform War, Degollado after Márquez, only for Márquez to succeed in killing Degollado as well.

Having been influenced by Mexican monarchist exiles, using Juárez's suspension of foreign debts as a pretext, and having the American Civil War prevent the enforcement of the Monroe Doctrine, French Emperor Napoleon III invaded Mexico in 1862 and sought local help in setting up a monarchical client state. The former liberal president Ignacio Comonfort, who had played such a key role in the outbreak of the Reform War, was killed in action that year after he had returned to the country and been given a military command to fight for the French. The former conservative president during the Reform War Manuel Robles Pezuela was also executed in 1862 by the Juárez government for attempting to help the French. Seeing the intervention as an opportunity to undo the Reform, conservative generals and statesmen who had played a role during the War of the Reform joined the French and a conservative assembly voted in 1863 to invite Habsburg Archduke Maximilian to become Emperor of Mexico.

The emperor, however, proved to be of liberal inclinations and ended up ratifying the Reform Laws. Regardless, Juárez's liberal government still resisted and fought the French and Mexican Imperial forces with the backing of the United States, which, since the end of the American Civil War, could now once again enforce the Monroe Doctrine. The French eventually withdrew in 1866, which led the monarchy to collapse in 1867. Former President Miguel Miramón and the conservative General Tomas Mejía would die alongside the Emperor; they were executed by a firing squad on June 19, 1867. Santiago Vidaurri, who had been Juárez's commander in the north during the Reform War, joined the Emperor and was captured and executed for his betrayal on July 8, 1867. Leonardo Márquez once again escaped, this time to Cuba, and lived there until his death in 1913 and published a defense of his role in the empire.

== See also ==
- Cristero War
- Carlist Wars
