= Santos Degollado =

Mexican politician (1811–1861)

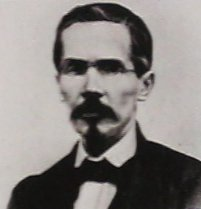
Santos Degollado

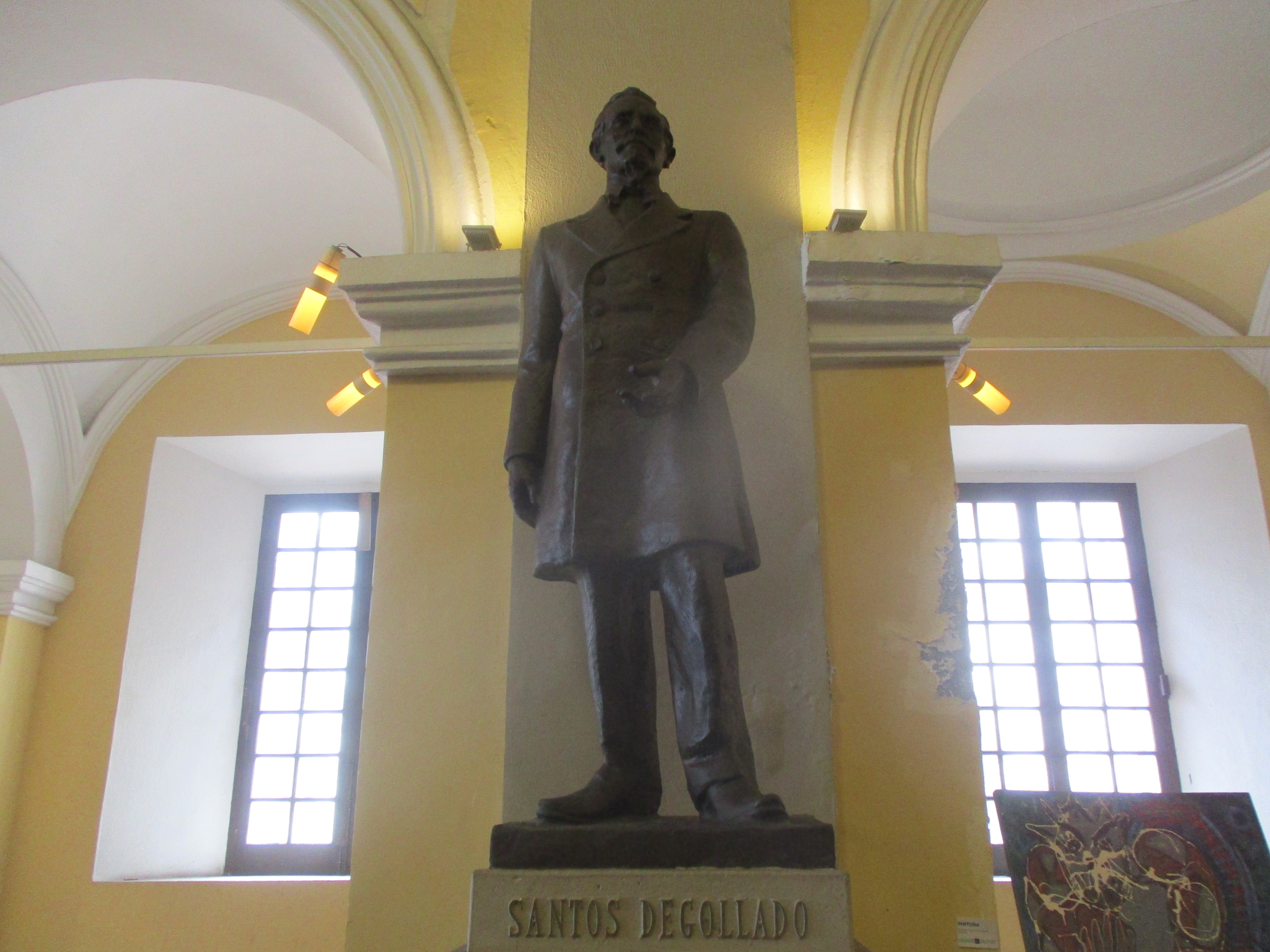
Monument in Veracruz

José Santos Degollado Sánchez (born November 1, 1811, in Hacienda de Robles, Guanajuato, Viceroyalty of New Spain – died June 15, 1861, in Llanos de Salazar, State of Mexico) was a Mexican liberal politician and military leader. He was raised by a priest in Michoacán and worked twenty years in the cathedral in Morelia. He became a Federalist in 1836 and entered politics in 1845 when he was elected to the Michoacán legislature in 1845. He replaced his close associate Melchor Ocampo as governor of Michoacán 27 March - 6 July 1848. He joined the Revolution of Ayutla. He became governor of Jalisco when the liberals successfully ousted Antonio López de Santa Anna. As with a number of rising Liberals, Degollado was not formally trained as a soldier, but gained military experience in the Revolution of Ayutla. He later fought for Benito Juárez's government. During Benito Juárez's presidency he served as Secretary of War and Navy and as Secretary of External Affairs. Degollado was a close friend of Guillermo Prieto and of Melchor Ocampo and fought by his side in many battles. Degollado was a resilient military leader, experiencing defeat after defeat in the Reform War that pitted the constitutional liberal government of Juárez against the conservatives. The army fielded by the conservatives was larger and better trained than the liberals' forces, but the liberals managed to achieve a stalemate for over two years and in the end triumphed. The liberal victory was not achieved by Degollado, who was in disgrace at the end of the war. Degollado was known as the "hero of defeats" for his ability to raise yet another army after yet another defeat. An experienced general who joined the liberal cause, General López Uraga, gave President Juárez a scathing assessment of the liberal army and Degollados's command of it. He had given everything he could to achieve a liberal victory, but his record of defeats meant his men were demoralized although continued to be loyal to him.

Degollado broke with Juárez in late 1859, as another liberal commander, Santiago Vidaurri, wished to be commander in chief of liberal forces, as did Degollado. Juárez sought an alternative to these two and appointed Manuel Doblado as commander. Vidaurri also broke with Juárez, who then tasked Degollado with dealing with Vidaurri. Degollado declared Vidaurri an outlaw and forced him over the border with Texas. Juárez strengthened his role as president by removing liberal rivals from military command. Degollado sought to end the military stalemate and rashly seized a mule-train with nearly a million-pesos' worth of British-owned silver, in order to finance the liberal cause. He immediately regretted the action, since it could have been the cause of an active British intervention in the war, undermining the Juárez government. The British had already recognized the rival conservative government of General Miguel Miramón. Degollado returned half of the seized silver to the British. A British diplomat, George Mathew, took Degollado's huge blunder and attempt to undo it as an opportunity to turn Degollado into an advocate of British foreign policy to bring about the end of the Reform War through mediation. Juárez viewed Degollado's advocacy of mediation as a betrayal of the liberal cause and the Constitution of 1857, since it entailed the resignation of Juárez as constitutional president. "Juárez warned Degollado of his total disapproval of his actions, which he would use all his powers to oppose."

In historian Ralph Roeder's assessment, Degollado's judgment was increasingly flawed, calling on Juárez to resign as constitutional president in order to end the costly and stalemated conflict. Juárez flatly refused, since he embodied the legitimacy of the constitutional government. Liberals chose Juárez and war rather than Degollado's mediated peace. Degollado's stance lost him the friendship and loyalty of Guillermo Prieto and Melchor Ocampo. Juárez relieved Degollado of his command, replacing him with López Uraga, who delivered a string of battlefield successes and ultimate victory for the liberals. Degollado was to face a military tribunal to judge his actions of seizing the British silver and its reversal, followed by Degollado advocating for a mediated peace. The trial was quietly dropped once the liberals secured victory. He never had the opportunity to have his day in court and after the Reform War remained an outcast in the eyes of liberals. When Melchor Ocampo and General Leandro Valle were assassinated in 1861 by conservatives led by General Leonardo Márquez, who remained at large and resorted to guerrilla warfare, Degollado, appointed by Juárez, sought to avenge Ocampo's death, but was also killed by Márquez in his attempt.

His remains were interred at the Panteón de Dolores in Mexico City, in the Rotunda of Illustrious Persons, on November 26, 1936.
