= Battle of Barranca Seca =

1862 battle in Mexico

Coordinates: 18.812845°N 97.17765°W

- Part of the Second French intervention in Mexico
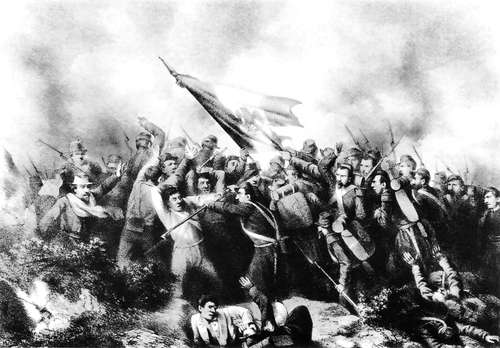
- Contemporary illustration of the Battle of Barranca Seca by Hesiquio Iriarte
Date	18 May 1862
Location	Barranca Seca, Veracruz, Mexico
Result	French victory

Belligerents
(Mexico) Mexican reactionists (France) Second French Empire	(Mexico) Mexican Republicans

Commanders and leaders
Leonardo Márquez; José Domingo Herran; Juan Vicario; José G. Campos Eugène Lefèvre	Santiago Tapia; Antonio Álvarez José Mariano Rojo

Units involved
Marquéz Brigade 2nd Battalion of the 99th Infantry of the Line	Eastern Army (See details)

Strength
2,500 450	500 1,400

Casualties and losses
212 Mexicans dead 2 French dead 26 injured	100 Republicans dead 200 wounded 1,200 POWs

The Battle of Barranca Seca was a battle of the Second French intervention in Mexico and took place right after the Battle of Puebla on 18 May 1862. Contrary to the latter it was won by the unified reactionist Mexican-French forces. The battle was preceded by a coup de chef of the reactionist forces, which was heated by the intrigue of the Spanish high command against Almonte and Márquez and French pressure towards the replacement of Zuloaga. After the battle Almonte remained the only contender for the Commander-in-Chief office within the reactionist party and Márquez as acting General; both of them serving French interests.

== Preparation for the battle ==
On 5 May General Ignacio Zaragoza ordered them to march from Atlixco to Izúcar de Matamoros to fill in for the departure of reactionist General Leonardo Márquez and prevent him from joining the French. The next morning, Tomás O'Horán Escudero and Antonio Carbajal brigades of the Eastern Army entered Puebla. In the evening, arrived the brigade Antillón, composed of the Guanajuato National Guard sent by the government, to strengthen the body of the Eastern Army. On the 7th The French was still residing at Amalucan Zaragoza ordered the brigade of Carbajal and Miguel Ameche's cavalry to march to Amozoc taking the rear-guard of the French Army. However this plan was double-crossed by Ignacio Echegaray, from the fort San Carlos de Perote, who imprisoned his commander Francisco Paz and defected to the French Army with the garrison of 300 men and joined reactionist general José Gálvez. General Zaragoza decided to change the orders given to Carbajal and direct him after the defectors, who on the 8th caught up with the deserted troops and after a two-hour fight at the Ixtapa valley dispelled them and took possession of the stolen equipment from Fort Perote.

On the night of May 8, reactionist General D. Florentino Lopez arrived in Amozoc, after escaping from the division commanded by Spanish General José M. Cobos. Lopez met with pro-French General Juan Almonte, already residing in the French camp, and told him that General Márquez was removed as the commander of the reactionist army by Félix María Zuloaga who was pretending to be president of the Republic, based on the old Plan de Tacubaya. This commandment was also given to General Cobos, who signed a secret agreement with republican Minister of Foreign Affairs Manuel Doblado, with the consent of the Chief of the Spanish Intervention Army, General Juan Prim, and lent that one million francs, which he was previously offered by the republican government of president Benito Juárez to maintain mutual neutrality during the intervention (thus General Prim had all the grounds to tell on a conference on 9 April that the reactionist generals betrayed Almonte, but he hid the fact that he was involved the betrayal of the aforementioned generals). At the moment General Almonte had become convinced of this plot against him and immediately sent to Márquez to adhere his orders, take command of the army, disregard the authority of general Zuloaga and Cobos and to come to unify with the French Army without delay. Herran, who was at Atlixco with all the cavalry and infantry corps, was ordered to submit himself to Márquez and place his troops to the general's disposition. .

The French Army led by Charles de Lorencez felt the consequences of the defeat at Puebla. He reorganized his troops and was about to get 2,500 cavalry as reinforcements at Orizaba from the pro-conservative Mexicans. He was accompanied and assisted by Alphonse Dubois de Saligny and Juan Almonte. The army left the camp to meet Leonardo Márquez' auxiliaries on the 9th and arrived to Tepeaca on the 11th. On 12th they moved to Acatzingo. The following day they relocated to Quecholac and then advanced to Palmar and Cañada the next two days. They took 22 cavalrymen prisoners in the former village. Meanwhile, Márquez was on his way to join the French but was blocked at the passage to Barranca Seca by Santiago Tapia of the "Álvarez" Brigade who controlled the Acultzingo-Orizaba road. Lorencez stopped at Acultzingo on the 17th and sent General Edmond-Aimable L'Hériller of the 99th Infantry Regiment of the Line to Orizaba next morning with two pieces of artillery to make contact with the reactionists and guard the Rio Blanco-Puebla route at Ingenio. On the Republican side Tapia also sent for another 1,000 soldiers from the main Estaren Army of Zaragoza to prevent this fusion. As he expected at 3 p.m. on the day of the battle further 1,400 infantrymen incorporated into his army to equal the reactionists.

Márquez headed his troops for Rancho del Potrero on the 17th, from where he continued his trip alone to Tecamalaca to personally meet the French officers leaving his command to José Domingo Herran, who was about to join him the next day with the army. There General Márquez, presented himself as the de facto elected interim supreme leader of Mexico as per the Treaty of Córdoba. He also confirmed that he arrested Generals Zuloaga and Cobos and brought them to Orizaba as prisoners(prior to this meeting Cobos tried to clear his name and change sides. He showed up to Almonte and offered him the same bribe money he received - worth of 200,000 piasters and one million francs in the form of U.S. treasury bill of exchange. He was hoping to get a presidential pardon in return but was rejected). General Almonte, enraged by the development of the events and the involvement of Zuloaga and Gobos he warned them that the best they could do was to leave the territory of Mexico. This is what they did, and both sailed from Vera Cruz to Havana after the battle (Cobos then left for the United States with the intention of getting his exchange bills cashed in, but the agreement with the United States Minister to Mexico Thomas Corwin, by which the U.S. pledged to pay eleven million dollars to Juarez, was not ratified by the U.S. Senate, Cobos returned unpaid to Havana and ended up being shot in Matamoros).

While negotiating with the French high command on the day of 18th Márquez was informed that at the road crossing at Barranca Seca the Republicans and the reactionists were facing each other already in battle order and within firing range of each other. He immediately rode back to take charge of his forces and start the battle.

== Battle ==
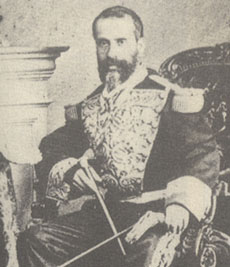
Leonardo Márquez, Commander-in-chief for the reactionist forces

The Republicans were divided into four columns covering the road between the flanks of two opposite hills of the valley. The center was defended by the infantry, which numbered 662 men and the dismounted Carabinier Corps of the "Álvárez" Brigade. General Márquez's units were split in two divisions; one, made of the combined brigades of Ponciano Castro and Juan Vicario commanded by and named after the latter as Division "Vicario" and the second, also a joint division of "Márquez" was put together of the brigades of Herrán and José G. Campos (although the troops were tired after a four-day 150 km march to Potrero. Herrán held the bridge on the Rio Blanco on the right flank with 50 fusiliers and had two columns as rear guard. The center was the same riflemen as the Republicans had led by Vicario covered by two columns of skirmishers and Campos guarded the left wing with one line of backup. The battle started slowly with none of the parties taking any risk and pushing back-and-forth within the firing range until finally at 5 p.m. the Republicans received major support from the main Eastern Army. Infantry Colonel José Mariano Rojo reached the battlefield with 1,100 fresh soldiers and launched a mixed frontal assault breaking the center of Márquez involving the "Hidalgo Battalion" and the Sappers Bataillon of San Luis. Herrán on the right was able to hold his position against a smaller mixed division of the Morelia pickets and repulse the attack. At this moment Eugène Lefèvre and his 99th Regiment from Ingenio ran 20 km within four hours in a hurry to intervene just in time. The French plunged into the Republican left wing and crushed it. General Vicario had already been wounded in the struggle and Herran was reinvigorated by the presence of the 99th Regiment that helped to hold the bridge. The three companies on the right, preceded by skirmishers pushed the center and left of the enemy vigorously with a bayonet charge and drove away his cavalry while the three companies heading to the left flank climbed the slopes despite the brisk fire. This momentum relieved the cavalry of General Marquez, who passed behind the French infantry and charged vigorously the enemy's left. The success of the fight was already assured, but this maneuver did fall into hands of the French and their auxiliaries a considerable number of prisoners. The pursuit of the withdrawing Republicans distracted by an unexpected infantry offense from the left. Afraid of being cut off and surrounded the French coloumn stopped and initiated a bayonet raid. Captain Herran and his French brigades passed the bridge and chased the Republicans to their camp. They reunited with the reactionist left wing who also pursued the remnants of the Eastern Army and taking the place of the center only stopped at Venta of San Diego when the night came. After one hour of fight hostilities were terminated at 6:15, the Mexicans were in full retreat, along with the main Republican Army, with whom they retired to San Agustín del Palmar.

== Mexican battle of order ==
The Mexican National Eastern Army counted 7,500 but only 2,000 participated in the battle.

Divisions of the Mexican troops

First Command

- Commander-in-chief, Brigadier General Ignacio Zaragoza
- Quartermaster, Brigadier General Francisco Mejía
- Commander of the Artillery, Coronel Zeferino Rodríguez
- Commander of the Engineers, Coronel Joaquín Colombres

Général de Division "Berriozábal"

- 1st Division d'Infanterie (Felipe B. Berriozábal)
  - 1st Brigade "Antillón" (Florencio Antillón)
    - 1st Light Infantry Battalion of Guanajuato
    - 3rd Light Infantry Battalion of Guanajuato
    - 6th Light Infantry Battalion of Guanajuato
  - 2nd Brigade "O'Horán" (Tomás O'Horán)
    - 1st Light Infantry Battalion of Toluca
    - 2nd Light Infantry Battalion of Toluca
    - 3rd Light Infantry Battalion of Toluca
    - Bataillon of fixed infantry of Veracruz
  - 3rd Brigade "Díaz" (Porfirio Díaz)
    - "Guerrero" Battalion of Oaxaca
    - "Morelos" Battalion of Oaxaca
    - 1st Battalion of the National Guard of Oaxaca
    - 6th Battalion of the National Guard of Oaxaca
  - 2x Marine artillery batteries
- 2nd Infantry Division (Miguel Negrete)
  - 1st Brigade "Lamadrid" (Francisco Lamadrid)
    - Riflemen Bataillon of San Luis
    - "Réforma" Bataillon
    - **Sappers Bataillon of San Luis**
    - 1st Light Battalion of San Luis
    - 2nd Light Battalion of San Luis
  - 2nd Brigade "Rojo" (José Mariano Rojo)
    - **Picket of the Battalion of Morelia**
    - **Picket of the Fusilier Battalion of Morelia**
    - **Picket of the Jäger Battalion of Morelia**
    - Riflemen Battalion of Mexico
    - **Battalion "Hidalgo" of Morelia**
    - 4th Battalion of the National Guard of Puebla
  - 3rd Brigade "Alatorre" (Francisco Alatorre)
    - Picket of the Battalion of Morelia
    - Mixed Battalion of Querétaro
    - Picket of the Jäger Battalion of Morelia
    - 6th Battalion of the line
    - 2nd Battalion of the National Guard of Puebla
    - 6th Battalion of the National Guard of Puebla
- **1st Cavalry Brigade "Álvarez" (Antonio Álvarez)**
  - **Carabinier Corps**
  - **Lancer Squadron of Toluca**
  - **Lancer Squadron of Oaxaca**
- 2nd Cavalry Brigade "Carbajal" (Antonio Carbajal)
  - 1st Lancer Corps of Morelia
  - Lancer Squadron of Quezada
  - 5th Police Corps
  - 1st Carabinier Corps
  - Scout Corps

- Bolded units actually participated in the battle

== See also ==
- List of battles of the second French intervention in Mexico
