= Florencio Antillón =

Mexican general and politician

Governor of Guanajuato
- In office January 26, 1867 – February 10, 1867
- Preceded by: Francisco de Paula Rodríguez
- Succeeded by: Francisco Z. Mena
- In office September 17, 1867 – January 3, 1877
- Succeeded by: León Guzmán Montes de Oca

Personal details
- Born: February 22, 1830 Guanajuato, México
- Died: February 18, 1903 (aged 72) Celaya, México
- Children: Julián Antillón
- Occupation: Politician, general

Francisco Florencio Antillón Moreno (22 of February 1830 - 18 February 1903) was a Mexican general and politician. He fought in the major Mexican wars of the 19th Century and served as governor of the state of Guanajuato between 1867 and 1876. During this period important civic developments took place in the city of Guanajuato.

== Biography ==
Born on February 22, 1830, in the city of Guanajuato, son of Manuel Antillón and Josefa Moreno. He started his military career at 14 years old in the 2nd Battalion of the 1st Regiment of Guanajuato. Fought against the US invasion of Mexico and saw action during the Reform War fighting on the side of the Liberals. On April 24, 1860, Antillón participated in the Battle of Loma Alta as Colonel in charge of the Guanajuato brigade, under General José López Uraga. He was ordered to march to Puebla in 1862, but arrived a day after the Battle of Puebla, and joined the Mexican Republican forces defeated in the Battle of Barranca Seca.

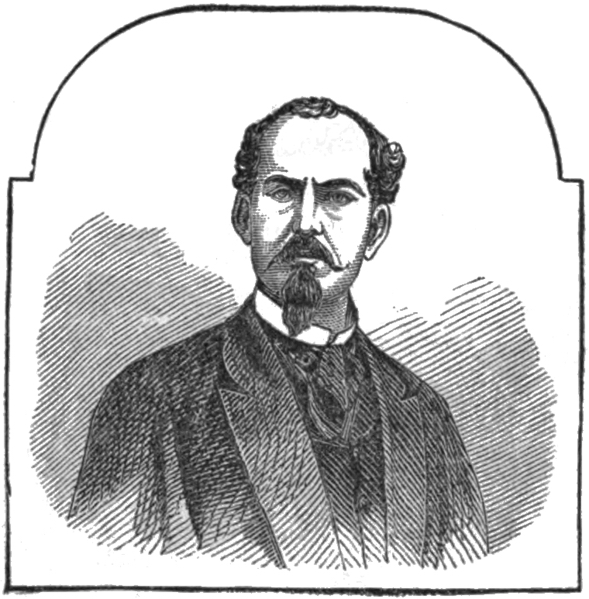
Depiction of Antillón from Our Sister Republic: A gal trip through tropical Mexico in 1869-1870

Antillón proclaimed himself governor of Guanajuato on September 17, 1867, and was recognized by President Benito Juárez. On January 26, 1868, he recovered the city of Guanajuato that had been occupied during the Second French intervention in Mexico, defeating Conservative General Feliciano de Liceaga.

During his stay in Guanajuato in 1870 American explorer Albert S. Evans described Antillón as "a man of splendid personal appearance, tall, handsome and intelligent."

On October 26, 1876, being the legal governor of the state of Guanajuato, Antillón recognized José María Iglesias as President of México, against the re-election of Sebastián Lerdo de Tejada. Antillón stayed as governor until December of that year, being replaced by Francisco Z. Mena and going into temporary exile. He returns from Europe in 1879 and participates in the presidential campaign of Manuel González Flores, himself running again for the governorship of Guanajuato but losing against Manuel Muñoz Ledo. Antillón retires from politics and goes to live to his hacienda in Santa María, near Celaya.

He dies in Celaya on February 18, 1903, being 72 years old.

== Legacy ==
During Antillón's time as governor several construction works were done in Guanajuato, some of the main examples listed below.

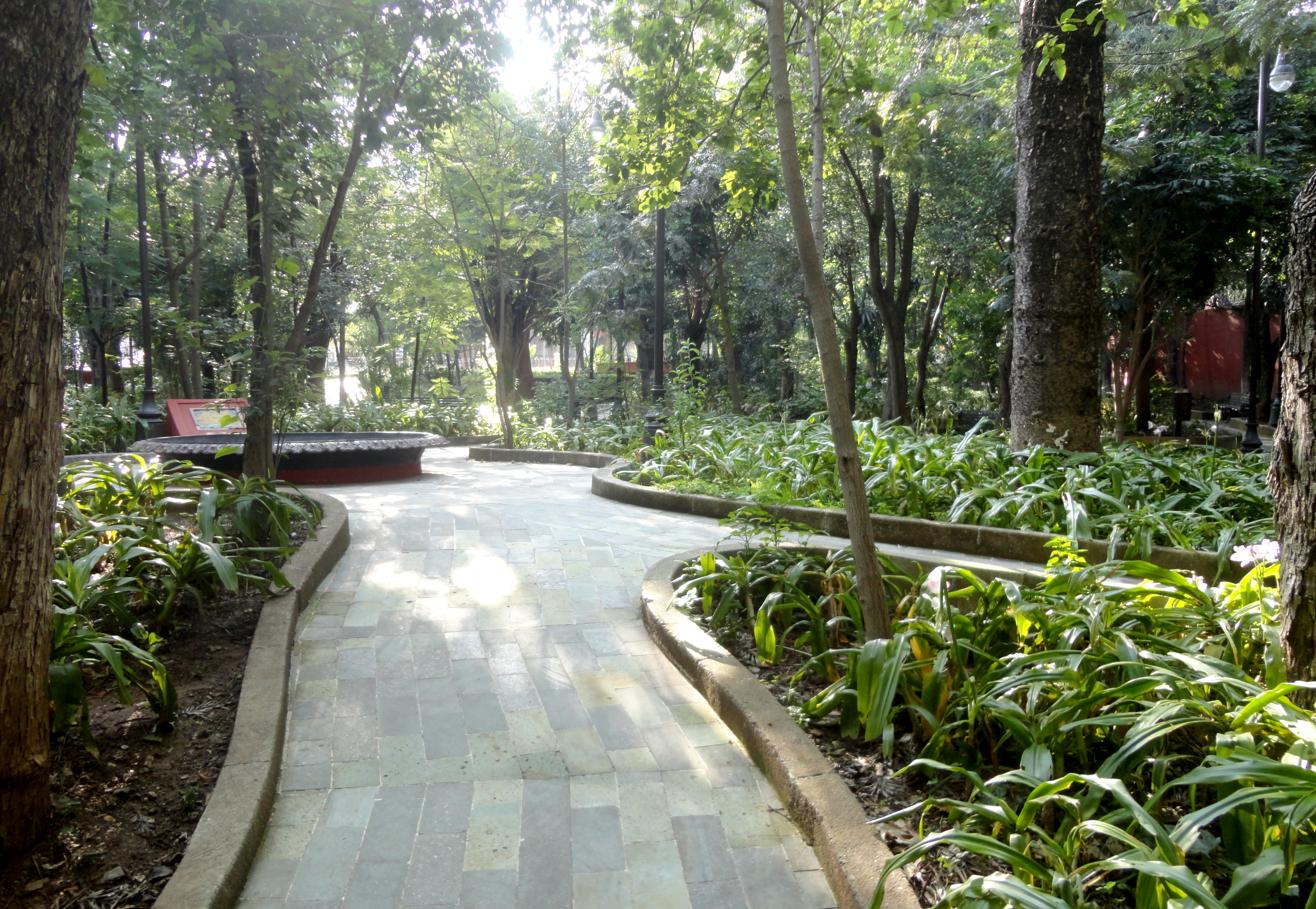
Florencio Antillón Park, in Guanajuato

- Decoration and refurbishment of the halls of the Government Palace, inaugurated in a New Year's ball on January 1, 1871.

- Ordered the construction of the Teatro Juárez, which started on January 2, 1873.

- Made significant improvements to the State College in 1875.

- Built the tunnel from the Presa de la Olla to the Zaragoza dam, which opened in July 1872.

In 1902 the garden next to the Presa de la Olla was officially named "Florencio Antillón park". In this park is located the tomb of writer Jorge Ibargüengoitia, a great-grandson of General Antillón. A plaque, referring to Antillón reads: "Here rests Jorge Ibargüengoitia in the park of his great-grandfather who fought against the French."
