= José María Arteaga =

Mexican politician and military general

Benemérito de la Patria José María Arteaga
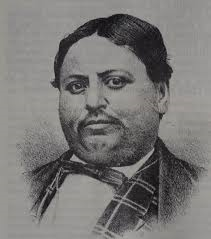

Governor of Querétaro
- In office July 1, 1857 – January 29, 1858
- President: Benito Juárez
- Preceded by: Sabino Flores
- Succeeded by: Francisco Verdusco
- In office December 1, 1860 – January 10, 1862
- Preceded by: Silvestre Méndez
- Succeeded by: Silvestre Méndez
- In office September 30, 1862 – February 2, 1863
- Preceded by: José Linares
- Succeeded by: José Linares

Governor of Jalisco
- In office June 20, 1863 – July 24, 1864
- Preceded by: Pedro Ogazón
- Succeeded by: Anacleto Herrera

Personal details
- Born: José María Cayetano Arteaga Magallanes; August 7, 1827 Mexico City, Mexico
- Died: October 21, 1865 (aged 38) Uruapan, Michoacán, Mexico

Military service
- Allegiance: Mexico
- Branch: Mexican Army
- Years of service: 1846 – 1865
- Rank: General
- Battles/wars: Mexican–American War; Reform War; Second Franco-Mexican War

José María Cayetano Arteaga Magallanes (August 7, 1827 – October 21, 1865) was a Mexican politician and general who served in the Mexican–American War, the Reform War and the Second French intervention in Mexico. Executed by Imperial forces during that invasion, Arteaga was recognized as one of the Martyrs of Uruapan.

== Biography ==
=== Early life ===
José was born on August 7, 1827, as the son of Don Manuel Arteaga and Doña María Polonia Magallanes. Being originally from Mexico City, his family moved to Hidalgo soon after. He graduated from the public schools of that same city and later dedicated himself to the tailoring trade. As a result of the Mexican–American War he left the tailor shop to become a soldier at the age of 20.

In 1852 he entered the army, starting as the first sergeant of the Aguascalientes active battalion. By 1854 he had the position of captain of the third light infantry belonging to the brigade under the orders of the conservative Félix Zuloaga, fighting against the Plan of Ayutla in the state of Guerrero. However, his liberal convictions led him to join the ranks of Don Juan Álvarez after the Battle of Nusco.

In April 1855, Arteaga was part of the light brigade in the liberal ranks of General Álvarez which was made available to Ignacio Comonfort. As a result of his conduct as a soldier, he was promoted to colonel with the position of major in May. For the rest of the year, he would fight in the Reform War in Jalisco and Colima.

=== Reform War ===
Later, Arteaga was chosen as Governor of Querétaro for the first time during the latter half of 1857. He took on the task of putting the 1857 Constitution into force in the state.

Querétaro was then under pressure from the conservative Tomás Mejía, who had seized several cities in the state and even attacked the city of Querétaro on November 2, 1857. Arteaga had only three hundred soldiers and could only defend the Government Palace and the Convent of San Francisco, where he placed his headquarters.

Arteaga was wounded and managed to save himself only thanks to the help of a friar who hid him in his cell. Several federal officers were taken prisoner, leaving the city in the hands of Mejía, whose troops sacked the city and a library recently founded by Arteaga was burnt to the ground. Mejía appointed Manuel Montes Navarrete as governor, which lasted a week until the approach of Manuel Doblado's army forced Mejía to leave the city and Arteaga was restored to his position.

To defend the 1857 Constitution against the Plan of Tacubaya, Arteaga organized a coalition of states with Jalisco, Guanajuato, Michoacán, Aguascalientes, Zacatecas, and Querétaro, which lasted until January 1858.

During the Reform War, Artega participated in Michoacán supporting the activity of Governor General Epitacio Huerta, promoting the manufacture of ammunition, cannons and military equipment. Due to his outstanding service he was granted citizenship of this State by a decree of September 22, 1859. From December 1860 to January 1862 he again was the Governor of Querétaro, during which time he restored the local congress.

General José María Arteaga was then the Chief of the Second Brigade of the Southern Division, under the command of General Diego Álvarez, and lived on his farm in Huetamo from where he oversaw both states. Beginning in May 1860, General Álvarez asked him to evict Colonel Juan Vélez, who had become a Conservative, from Cutzamala de Pinzón in Ajuchitlán. Vélez took refuge with his people in the Colony called "El pueblo españolizado de Tierra Caliente".

Cutzamala was made the capital of the Mina District to replace Ajuchitlán in 1850. When Colonel Juan Vélez arrived in Cutzamala, he placed men in the nave of the monumental church and its tower, keeping tortilla chips and salted meat in the attached former convent. General Arteaga arrived in Cutzamala on May 7 at 8 in the morning, coming from Tlacotepec and Tlalchapa with two thousand infantry. As he was en route to the El Barco neighborhood he was attacked by a column from Vélez, but the Conservatives retreated to the town.

Arteaga laid siege to Cutzamala in the afternoon of that day, but since the church was an authentic fortress on top of a large hill, he could not dislodge it and therefore maintained the siege for many days. On June 1, 1860, the First Brigade commanded by Governor General Vicente Jiménez and the 3rd Brigade of the Southern Division with General Diego Álvarez arrived in Cutzamala to support him, making a total of 4,500 Liberal infantry. After 45 days of bitter fighting, on the afternoon of June 21, and during a strong storm, Colonel Juan Vélez left the church at full gallop and headed north, accompanied by his officers, to cross the swollen Cutzamala River. Several died but Colonel Vélez managed to arrive at Nanchetitla.

The three Brigades that were besieging Cutzamala entered the town, capturing the church and taking 186 men prisoner, some were sent to the Acapulco fort and others shot behind the church. General Arteaga then entered the church "with his hat and boots on, insulting the families who had taken refuge there." That site was so important that President Benito Juárez was on the lookout according to three letters found in his archive. The victory marked the triumph of Liberalism in the South of the country.

=== Second French Intervention in Mexico ===
Manuel Robles Pezuela, who had been interim president of the State of Mexico between 1858 and 1859, had received an amnesty after the Conservatives lost the war in 1860. When France sent troops to overthrow the Republic and install a monarchy in its place, Robles Pezuela accepted an offer from General Juan Almonte to join his government that was working with the French. Robles Pezuela then began traveling to Tehuacán to start talks with the high command of the French Army.

General Arteaga captured him, however, in the town of Tuxtepec on March 19, 1862, after the foreign minister, Manuel Doblado, warned General Ignacio Zaragoza of Robles Pezuela's betrayal. Arteaga brought Robles Pezuela before General Zaragoza in San Andrés Chalchicomula, Puebla, where he was court-martialed and shot on March 23.

On April 28, 1862, the French Commander, General Charles de Lorencez, ordered the occupation of the Cumbres de Acultzingo to provide security for the rest of the invading army. The timely arrival of General Porfirio Díaz prevented the defeat from turning into a disaster. As reported by General Zaragoza, General José María Arteaga was wounded resisting the French. President Juárez decorated him in Puebla as Hero of Acultzingo.

Arteaga next served as governor of the State of Jalisco from 1863 to 1864. As governor Arteaga prohibited application of the death penalty, unless there was a sentence from the judicial authority.

As a soldier, Arteaga was promoted to Division General and named General-in-Chief of the Army of the Center, working with Generals Vicente Riva Palacio and Carlos Salazar Ruiz.

=== Execution ===
On October 13, 1865 General Arteaga arrived with his subordinates at the town of Santa Ana Amatlán, where he and his troops were subsequently surprised by forces under the command of Ramón Méndez, who took around 400 soldiers and 100 officers prisoner. When he learned he was going to be executed he wrote to his mother:

I have been taken prisoner by the imperial troops and tomorrow I will be executed; I beg you, mother, to forgive me for the long time that against your wishes I have followed the way of a soldier. The scaffold, my mother, does not bring dishonor, does not disgrace the soldier who does his duty and serves his country. Mama, I have nothing left to me but my untarnished name, in which respect I have taken nothing from others and I have faith that God will forgive me my sins and receive me in His glory. In this final hour, it is my consolation to bequeath to my family a name without blemish. My only crime is having fought for the independence of my country.

General Arteaga along with his companions General Salazar, Colonels Jesús Díaz and Trinidad Villagómez, and Captain Juan González were shot on October 21, 1865, in Uruapan, Michoacán following the Bando Negro or "Black Decree" issued by Maximilian on October 3 that called for execution of all Republican guerrillas captured by Imperial forces.

=== Legacy ===
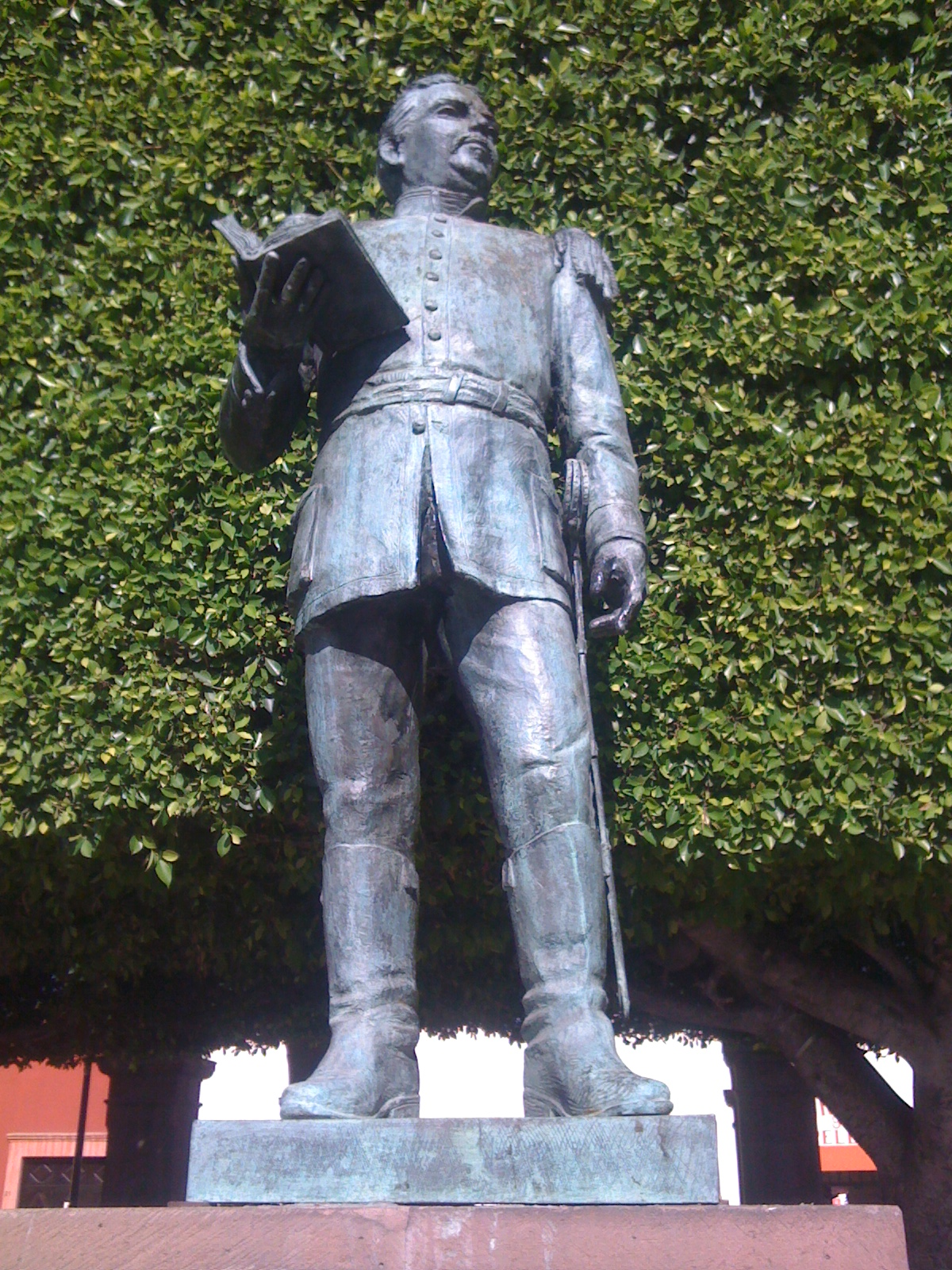
Statue of Jose Maria Arteaga in Querétaro

Once the republic was restored, Arteaga was recognized as the Martyr of Uruapan. His surname was added to the name of Querétaro by a decree of the State Legislature of July 23, 1867, being known as Querétaro de Arteaga until 2008, the year in which the legislature repealed the Political Constitution of the Free and Sovereign State of Querétaro and the State took back the name of Querétaro. The name of Querétaro de Arteaga was proposed by the governor and military commander Colonel Julio M. Cervantes; the decree declared:

General José María Arteaga devoted his entire life to the service of the Nation, being a brave supporter of its freedom and its reforms and fighting firmly and constantly for independence, without compromising for a single moment with the enemies of Mexico; that during the time he was governor of the State of Querétaro, he took great care that it progressed, promoting primary and secondary education and the progress of the press, reforming scientific and literary establishments, creating new ones and seeking all kinds of material improvements, repeatedly saving the capital from aggressions from the mountains.

On July 17, 1869, the bodies of Arteaga and Salazar were taken with honors to the San Fernando pantheon in Mexico City, where their remains were deposited. Finally, in 1872 the Congress of the Union declared him Benemérito de la Patria. The official newspaper of Querétaro La Sombra de Arteaga is named after him.

His two sons, Emiliano and Fernando, settled in Hidalgo, where the Arteaga Family continues to live.
