= Statue of Ignacio Vallarta =

Statue of Ignacio Vallarta may refer to:

- Statue of Ignacio Vallarta (Guadalajara), Jalisco, Mexico
- Statue of Ignacio Vallarta (Puerto Vallarta), Jalisco, Mexico
