= Ingenio =

Ingenio may refer to:

- Engenho (Portuguese), or ingenio (Spanish), a Colonial-era term for a sugar cane mill
- Ingenio, Las Palmas, a municipality in the eastern part of the island of Gran Canaria
- Valle de los Ingenios (Valley of the Sugar Mills), near Trinidad, Cuba
- Ingenio La Trinidad, Tucumán, a settlement in northern Argentina
- Ingenio River, Puerto Rico
- Ingenio District, Peru
- SEOSat-Ingenio, a Spanish optical imaging satellite
- Ingenio et Arti (from Latin: For Spirit and Art), a Danish medal awarded to prominent Danish and foreign scientists and artists

== See also ==
- Ingenia (disambiguation)
