= Antonio Rojas =

Antonio Rojas may refer to:

- Antonio de Rojas Manrique (died 1527), Roman Catholic prelate
- Antonio Rojas (guerrilla) (1818–1865), Mexican guerrilla
- Antonio Rojas (Paraguayan footballer) (born 1984), midfielder
- Antonio Rojas (Spanish footballer) (born 1984), centre forward
- José Antonio Rojas (born 1987), Chilean footballer

== See also ==
- Rojas
- Rojas (disambiguation)
