= Capture of Morelia (1863) =

War event between France and Mexico in the 19th century

- Part of the Second French intervention in Mexico
Date	30 November 1863
Location	Morelia, Michoacán, Mexico
Result	French victory

Belligerents
(Mexico) Mexican republicans	(France) French Empire

Commanders and leaders
(Mexico) José López Uraga	(France) Alfredo Berthelin (Mexico) Leonardo Márquez

The Capture of Morelia took place on 30 November 1863 during the Second French intervention in Mexico. It was fought between French troops in the charge of generals Berthier and Márquez and Mexican army commanded by José López Uraga.
