= Ingenia (disambiguation) =

Ingenia is a genus of marine roundworms. It may also refer to:

- Ingenia, the genus of dinosaurs merged into the genus Heyuannia
- Ingenia Technology, the security tech company
- Ingenia Communications Corporation, the developer of SchoolNet, a Canadian educational technology project

== See also ==
- Ingentia, another genus of dinosaurs
- Ingenio
