= Carlos Salazar Ruiz =

Mexican General

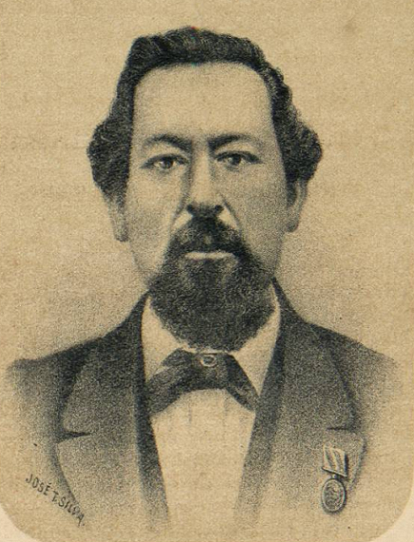
- Born: August 10, 1829; Matamoros, Tamaulipas, Mexico
- Died: October 21, 1865 (aged 36); Uruapan, Michoacán, Mexico
- Education: Heroico Colegio Militar
- Military career
- Allegiance: Centralist Republic of Mexico; Second Federal Republic of Mexico
- Branch: Mexican Army
- Service years: 1840–1865
- Rank: General
- Conflicts: Mexican–American War: Battle of Churubusco; Ayutla Revolution; Reform War; Second French intervention in Mexico: Battle of Puebla

Carlos Benito Salazar Ruiz (1829–1864) was a Mexican General, martyr of Uruapan and the son of Captain Benito Salazar Vargas and Mercedes Ruiz Castañeda. He is notable for his participation in several revolutions and battles during 19th-century Mexico.

== Biography ==
In his childhood he was kicked by a horse after he pulled its tail and his forehead would be marked with that scar all his life. Partly because of his concern and partly because of his scar, they said he looked like "the devil himself." During his youth he entered the Heroico Colegio Militar, he was a companion of the liberal Leandro Valle and the conservative Miguel Miramón.

While still a cadet, he joined Leonardo Márquez's army as a volunteer, days before the Battle of Churubusco. He was wounded in the leg and he received an honorary medal and an epaulet on his left shoulder for his bravery but he saw indignantly since his convalescence, Mexico surrendered to the United States on September 13, 1847.

However, with what happened, he reaffirmed his vocation for his military career. When the Ayutla Revolution occurred, a movement developed from a plan proclaimed by Florencio Villareal supported by Juan Álvarez and Ignacio Comonfort, on March 1, 1854, to end the dictator Antonio López de Santa Anna. Salazar participated in this revolution that gave the possibility of his participation of the creation of the Federal Constitution of the United Mexican States of 1857.

With Comonfort's betrayal in the self-coup and Félix María Zuloaga's coup supported by the Mexican clergy of the time thus provoking the Reform War and Salazar, without hesitation, joined the liberals. In 1860 he was already Lieutenant where he served first in the Moctezuma Battalion and then in the San Luis Potosí Riflemen. Following the Second French intervention in Mexico, was one of the first to march to the state of Veracruz, to the landing of the French. For his distinction in the Battle of Puebla of May 5, 1862, he was promoted to Colonel. The following year in the Siege of Puebla, its population that fell before the site; however, he was able to escape at the time of the surrender by entering a private house, suffering great risk, since the owner participated in the Imperial ideas and tried to denounce him, but Salazar opportunely managed to subdue him and left him unable to denounce him, he waited for the arrival of the night and undertook the flight to Mexico City, thus continuing to fight for the liberal cause. When Benito Juárez left Mexico City before the French and Imperials approaching, Salazar was in the force that escorted him, and already in San Luis Potosí and President Juárez promoted him to the rank of general.

Later, he went to Michoacán with the troops of the western army, he was seen appearing in Morelia as a hero on December 18, 1863, and was provisionally in charge of the government of Michoacán from October 15, 1864, to May 20, 1865, and the military commander in June and July.

Along with General José María Arteaga and General Vicente Riva Palacio, they made up the decisive Army of the center, of which Salazar was Barracks Master. On September 16, 1865, during the celebration of the Mexican day of independence, in Tacámbaro, one of the main republican strongholds in the region, they prepared their plan of attack to confront the Imperial forces commanded by General Ramón Méndez in the region.

Around the twelfth of October, when they were preparing to take the ranch, they received reports that the enemy was approaching. With great speed, the republican forces broke camp and moved towards Santa Ana Amatlán, where they arrived on the 13th. General Arteaga ordered his officers Julián Solano and Pedro Tapia to gather thirty men each; the first, to monitor the movements of Méndez's imperial army and the second to guard, from an elevation, the entrance to the town. Based on Solano's reports, which indicated that Méndez had not moved from his position, it was enough for Arteaga and Salazar to order their men to rest. However confidence would cement his fate as around 11 in the morning, the stillness of the town was broken by the violent incursion of the imperial troops. Arteaga was immediately arrested. Salazar realized what was happening and immediately took up arms to offer meager resistance from the house he was occupying. Running out of ammunition, he surrendered to the Imperial forces. Unfortunately, Solano and Tapia, the two officers on whom Arteaga put the security of the republican army, had betrayed him and switched sides over to the Imperial Mexican Army after being bribed with money.

By the time Méndez learned of the capture of Arteaga and Salazar, he had already recently received news on the recent law by Maximilian I of Mexico on October 3, 1865, which without any trial, sentenced any defender of the Republic to death. The prisoners were taken to Uruapan and received the news that they would be shot on October 21. Along with the two generals, Lieutenant Colonel Trinidad Villagómez, Colonel Jesús Díaz Ruiz and Captain Juan González would taste the bitter cup of the gallows.

In a humble moment, Arteaga asked Salazar not to let him waver, to help him stand up in front of the platoon with courage and dignity. Salazar hugged him and said: "Don't worry General, we are going to show you how men die." The bells of the village parish announced 5 in the morning. In the previous days it had rained in the surroundings, so the atmosphere smelled of damp earth. It was cold. The prisoners were taken from their cell and firmly walked to the main square of Uruapan. The five prisoners stood in front of the platoon. Arteaga stepped forward and said: " I die defending the integrity of my country, not as a general, but as a citizen. "». When he finished, he took his place again. Salazar, without moving, unbuttoned his shirt and showed the shooters where the heart was, and in an unshakeable voice he said: "I'm going to show how a loyal Republican killed by traitors dies." The platoon followed orders carefully and hearing fire, a loud volley broke the silence. The bodies immediately fell to the ground, pierced by bullets.

By the end of 1868, the Federal Government and the State of Michoacán agreed to transfer the bodies to Mexico City. A year later, on Friday June 25, 1869, they were exhumed from their grave and left the land they defended until death. The mortal remains arrived in Mexico City on July 15 due to the posthumous tributes of the itinerary, and on Saturday July 17, 1869 they were finally placed in special crypts in the Civil Pantheon of San Fernando, which has become the place of the illustrious characters of the 19th century in Mexico.
