= Tripyloididae =

Scientific classification
- Domain: Eukaryota
- Kingdom: Animalia
- Phylum: Nematoda
- Class: Chromadorea
- Order: Araeolaimida
- Family: Tripyloididae; Filipjev, 1918

Family of nematodes

Tripyloididae is a family of nematodes belonging to the order Araeolaimida.

== Characteristics ==
The following traits define the genus:

- the amphid is located posterior to the buccal cavity
- the spicule is wide
- the gubernaculum has little teeth
- the tail is conico-cylindrical
- the male reproductive system consists of a single testis
- the female didelphic has reflexed ovaries.

== Genera ==
Genera:

- Arenasoma Yeates, 1967
- Bathylaimoides Allgén, 1959
- Bathylaimus Cobb, 1894
- Ingenia Gerlach, 1957

== Species ==
Tripyloides acherusius

Tripyloides amazonicus

Tripyloides amoyanus n. sp.

Tripyloides brevis

Tripyloides caudaensis

Tripyloides gracilis

Tripyloides granulatus

Tripyloides imitans

Tripyloides mangrovensis n. sp.

Tripyloides marinus

Tripyloides omblaica

Tripyloides pallidus

Tripyloides septentrionalis

Tripyloides soyeri

Tripyloides taafi

Tripyloides undulatus
