= Siege of Querétaro =

1867 Mexican Republican victory

Coordinates: 20.5881°N 100.3881°W

Siege of Queretaro
- Part of the Second French intervention in Mexico
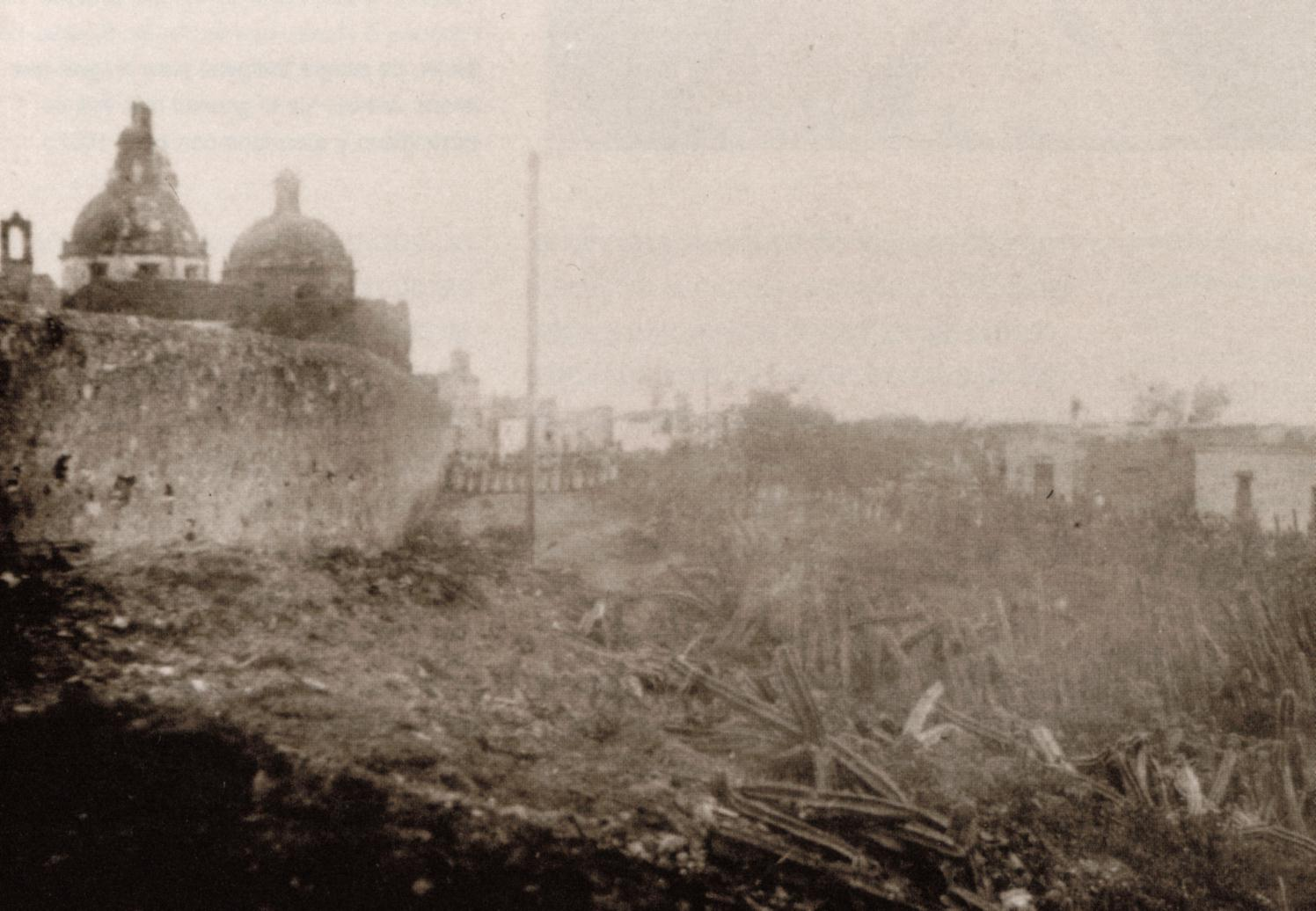
- Republican militiamen entering Querétaro
Date	6 March to 15 May 1867
Location	Querétaro, Mexico
Result	Mexican Republican victory

Belligerents
(Mexico) Mexican Republicans	(Mexico) Mexican Empire

Commanders and leaders
(Mexico) Mariano Escobedo (Mexico) Ramon Corona (Mexico) Gerónimo Treviño (Mexico) Sóstenes Rocha (Mexico) Francisco Arce (Mexico) Nicolás Régules	(Mexico) Maximilian I (executed) (Mexico) Miguel Miramón (executed) (Mexico) Leonardo Márquez (Mexico) Tomás Mejía (executed) (Mexico) Felix Salm-Salm (surrendered) (Mexico) Manuel Ramírez de Arellano (Mexico) Ramón Méndez (executed)

Units involved
42,000	10,000

Casualties and losses
2,000	9,500

The siege of Querétaro was the culminating battle of the Second French intervention in Mexico and the Second Mexican Empire. It took place between Republican and Imperial armies from 6 March to 15 May 1867.

After the French departed, the remaining Imperial forces were concentrated in the center of the country. Emperor Maximilian decided to head to the city of Querétaro, while a remaining force was left at the capital. Republican forces arrived at Querétaro on 5 March, after which the siege began. The imperialists held off and won some skirmishes, before the increasing Republican forces made them contemplate an attempt at breaking the lines and heading for the coast. This plan was thwarted however, when Miguel López opened the gates of the town to the enemy, after which the imperialists were overwhelmed.

Maximilian and his generals were captured, tried, and condemned to death. He was executed by firing squad, alongside his generals Miguel Miramón and Tomás Mejía, on the morning of 19 June at the Cerro de las Campanas.

== Battle ==
Maximilian joined the army at Querétaro along with Minister Manuel García Aguirre, Leonardo Márquez, and Miguel López with the sum of fifty thousand pesos, with sixteen hundred men and twelve cannons. Maximilian reached Querétaro on 19 February, and was received with enthusiasm by Miramón and the other generals who held a formal reception for the emperor.

A few days after his arrival a review of the troops was held, showing 9,000 men with 39 cannon, including about 600 Frenchmen, Miramón was placed at the head of the infantry, of which Castillo and Casanova received each a division, Méndez assuming command of the reserve brigade, in which Miguel López served as colonel, Mejía became chief of the cavalry, Reyes of engineers, and Arellano of the artillery. Márquez, chief of the general staff, was accorded the foremost place, to the indignity of Miramón. Maximilian, Miramón, Márquez, Mejía, and Méndez became known as the five magic M’s of the Empire.

In the first council of war that had been held on 22 February, it had been agreed to fight the Republicans at once, before their combined forces became too strong, but ultimately this strategy, which historian Bancroft suggests could have achieved victory, was rejected at Márquez's behest. As the liberals began to surround Querétaro, Márquez then suggested to flee to Mexico City, still held by the Imperialists, gather their forces and face the liberal armies in one final decisive battle, but this was deemed as impractical.

On 5 March, the Republican forces came into view of the defenders at Querétaro, and began to prepare for a siege. After the fighting had begun Márquez once again brought up his plan of retreating to Mexico City, but Miramón and others strongly opposed it. Miramón planned to lead a counter attack to recover the hill of San Gregorio on 17 March. When the time arrived however, a false alarm arose that the Imperialist headquarters were under attack, leading to the assulat on San Gregorio to be put off.

Miramón now expressed his support for a plan to destroy the Republicans' western positions, therefore providing a way to retreat if needed. Márquez was assigned to go to Mexico City to seek reinforcements. Miramón was assigned to provide a distraction and on 22 March he led an expedition down the valley, which captured a quantity of provisions. Márquez was able to depart during the night with 1200 horsemen and Miramón now became the leading general at Querétaro.

After the Imperialists repulsed another Republican assault, leaving the latter with 2000 deaths, Miramón, during an award ceremony, took one of the medals and asked to decorate the Emperor for his conduct during the battle, which Maximilian accepted, and would go on the wear as the most valued of his decorations.

On 1 April Miramón led a counter attack to the hill of San Gregorio, but lack of reinforcements left the attack without any decisive results.

As any news of Márquez failed to arrive, a mission was sent to Mexico City to see what happened. Miramón urged Maximilian to leave as well but, the latter chose to stay. The mission failed, and now leading officers outright urged surrender.

The Imperialists now planned to fight their way out of Querétaro, and as preparation Miramón planned an attack on the Cimatario Hill on 27 April, to which he advanced with 2000 men. The Imperialist repulsed the Republican forces, dispersing thousands and taking 500 prisoners, but the Imperialists squandered vital time planning their next move, and Republican reserves arrived to provide a defeat.

The Imperialists now sought to break through the enemy lines, seek refuge in the mountain range of the Sierra Gorda, and possibly reach the coast. The operation was scheduled to take place on 15 May.

Unfortunately for the Imperialists, before these plans were carried out they were betrayed by Colonel Miguel López who, on the night of 14 May, opened the gates of Querétaro to the Republican forces in exchange for a sum of gold. Republican troops quickly overwhelmed the city and Miramón, Mejía, and Maximilian were taken prisoner.
