= Miguel Negrete =

Mexican Major General

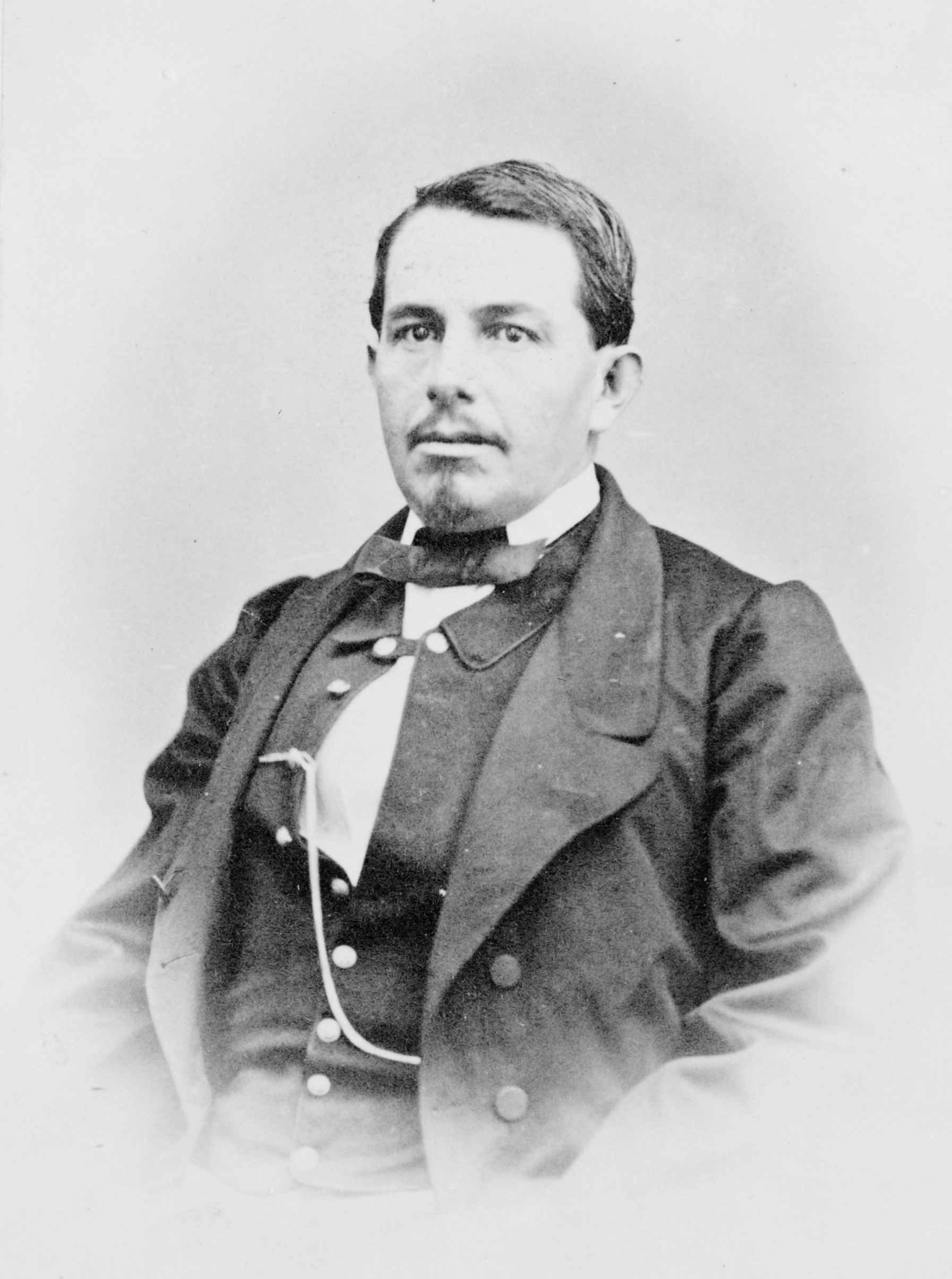

Governor of Puebla
- In office October 13, 1863 – November 4, 1863
- President: Benito Juárez
- Preceded by: José María Maldonado
- Succeeded by: Raphael Cravioto

Minister of War and Navy of Mexico
- In office March 16, 1864 – August 23, 1865
- Preceded by: Ignacio Suárez Navarro
- Succeeded by: Ignacio Mejía

Personal details
- Born: May 8, 1825 Tepeaca, Puebla, Mexico
- Died: January 5, 1895 (aged 69) Mexico City, Mexico
- Party: Conservative Party; Liberal Party

Military service
- Allegiance: Second Federal Republic of Mexico; Restored Republic; Porfiriato
- Branch: Mexican Army
- Years of service: 1846 – 1879
- Rank: Major General
- Battles/wars: Mexican–American War; Reform War; Battle of Calpulalpan; Second Franco-Mexican War; Battle of Las Cumbres; Battle of Puebla; Siege of Puebla; Plan de la Noria; Tuxtepec Revolution

José Miguel Pascual Negrete Novoa, commonly known as Miguel Negrete was a 19th-century Mexican Major General. He participated in the many Mexican Civil Wars, as well as the Mexican–American War and the Second French intervention in Mexico. Negrete was also the Governor of Puebla from October 13, 1863, to November 4, 1863, and the Minister of War and Navy of Mexico from March 16, 1864 to August 23, 1865.

== Mexican–American War and Ayutla Revolution ==
He was the son of Cayetano Negrete and Aparicia Novoa. Miguel Negrete fought against the Americans during the Mexican–American War. In 1855 he took up arms in Zamora, Michoacán during the Ayutla Revolution in support of the liberal forces with the aim of overthrowing the dictatorship of Antonio López de Santa Anna and was promoted to colonel after these conflicts.

== Reform War ==
After the pronouncement of Félix Zuloaga's Plan de Tacubaya against the government of Ignacio Comonfort and the Federal Constitution of 1857, Negrete decided to join Zuloaga's faction, militating in these forces and embracing the ideals of the conservatives during the Reform War.

At the end of December 1857, the period of pronouncements against the conservative troops begins. With this, Miguel Negrete, after arriving in Santa Ana Chiautempan, Tlaxcala, showed himself in favor of the Constitution, putting it back into force in the state of Tlaxcala, taking the state capital and, immediately afterwards, attacking Puebla City.

In April 1858 he switched sides again, this time with the Conservatives, and was therefore promoted to the rank of General at the behest of the Conservative General Miguel Miramón.

He participated together with Leonardo Márquez and José Joaquín Ayesterán on December 22, 1860, in the Battle of Calpulalpan. He was defeated by liberal troops commanded by Jesús González Ortega in the plains of Calpulalpan, State of Mexico. He retired to private life thanks to an amnesty offered by the Juárez government.

== French intervention ==
During the Second French Intervention in Mexico, Negrete put aside his conservative ideology and participated in the defense of Mexican territory. Before the advance of the French troops towards the center of Mexico, Negrete reacted and sided with the liberal side with his famous phrase Yo tengo Patria antes que Partido, ("I have a country before a party").

Negrete joined the republican army and under the orders of General Ignacio Zaragoza, both covered themselves with glory in the Battle of Las Cumbres and the Battle of Puebla, coming to be considered as the second hero of said battle by defending Fort Loreto. Regarding this, Ernesto de la Torre comments:

Negrete, with 1,200 soldiers and two field and mountain batteries, defended the heights and was the one who bore the brunt of the battle and to whom the victory was due, heroically aided by all his companions, accurately led by General Ignacio Zaragoza.

Around 1863, and being governor of the State of Puebla, before the advance of the French troops, he and Jesús González Ortega were entrusted with the defense of the Siege of Puebla. He was then captured by the French along with Jesús González Ortega, Felipe Berriozábal and Porfirio Díaz. All of them would be captured on the way to Veracruz and, after that, taken prisoners to France but Negrete managed to escape. Placed under Benito Juárez, he was Minister of War and Navy of Mexico from March 1864 to August 1865. He took part in the capture of the cities of Monterey and Saltillo.

== Restored Republic ==
After the French intervention, he came to revolt against Juárez on two occasions, in which he was repelled and brought to order. The first was to support Julio Chávez López in Texcoco who had launched the Manifesto in Chalco to all the oppressed and poor of Mexico and the universe. Negrete managed to take the forts of Loreto and Guadalupe, but was soon apprehended and sentenced to death. General Porfirio Díaz granted him his pardon for his past participation in the battle and in the Siege of Puebla.

In 1872 he supported the Plan de la Noria against the government of Juárez under the slogan "No re-election". Due to the unexpected death of Juárez, Sebastián Lerdo de Tejada assumed the presidency and the Noria rebellion halted afterwards. Four years later, at the end of Lerdo de Tejada's presidential term, faced with the imminent attempt at re-election, Negrete participated, supporting Porfirio Díaz in the Tuxtepec Revolution in 1876, again under the principle of "Let no Mexican perpetuate himself in the power and this will be the last revolution", as well as under the slogan "Effective suffrage, No re-election!".

== Porfiriato ==
In 1879, during the Porfiriato, Negrete published a manifesto addressed to the nation, criticizing and accusing Porfirio Díaz of betraying the Constitution of 1857.

I fought the administration of Mr. Juárez despite the great respect for that high figure, whose fame has been consecrated by history, when his continuation in government had broken the support of public opinion and the foundation of the national will. The people then snatched me from the steps of the scaffold: to him I owe my life and to him alone I consecrate my existence ...

I returned to the field of the revolution, when I saw that the entire country had abstained from attending the presidential elections, and that through an official election a man and a situation were imposed on the Republic for another four years and against his will ...

At this very moment, public guarantees are being conspired, setting up an electoral farce for the next presidency, in which the people appear as the king of ridicule, in the cowardly supplanting of constitutional suffrage ...

— Miguel Negrete (June 1, 1879)

He took up arms against President Porfirio Díaz in the states of Querétaro, Guanajuato and San Luis Potosí. He joined the Sierra Gorda socialist plan but was again defeated. He decided to retire to private life.

He died on January 5, 1897, in Mexico City. His remains were interred at the Rotunda of Illustrious Persons on May 5, 1948. On December 5, 2007, in the Plenary Hall of the Legislative Assembly of the Congress of Puebla, the name of the general poblano "Miguel Negrete" was written in gold letters.
