= José López Uraga =

Mexican general and ambassador (1808–1885)

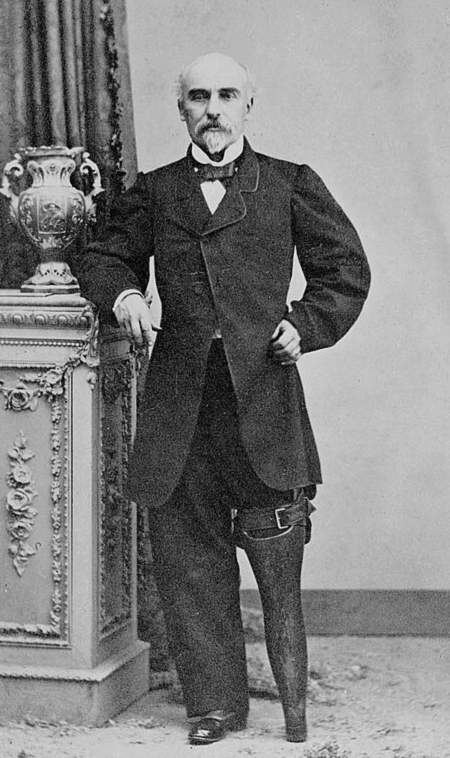

Mexican Ambassador to Germany
- In office April 13, 1853 – November 12, 1855
- President: Manuel María Lombardini
- Preceded by: Luis Gonzaga Cuevas
- Succeeded by: Miguel María Arrioja

Personal details
- Born: March 17, 1808 Valladolid, Michoacán, New Spain, Spain
- Died: February 4, 1885 (aged 76) San Francisco, California, U.S.

Military service
- Allegiance: Centralist Republic of Mexico; Second Federal Republic of Mexico; Second Mexican Empire
- Branch: Mexican Army; Imperial Mexican Army
- Years of service: 1839–1866
- Rank: General
- Battles/wars: Mexican–American War; Texas Campaign; Battle of Palo Alto; Northern Mexican Theater; Battle of Monterrey; Reform War; Battle of Loma Alta; French Intervention in Mexico

José Benito Patricio Gabriel López Uraga (1808-1885) was a 19th-century Mexican general. He participated and fought in the Mexican–American War, the Reform War and the Second French intervention in Mexico. He also served as the Mexican ambassador to Germany from April 13, 1853, to November 12, 1855.

== Biography ==
He was born in Valladolid (modern-day Morelia, Michoacán) on March 17, 1808, as the son of José Benito López Fernández and María de la Luz Uraga y Gutiérrez. He participated in the Mexican–American War and initially participated in the Battle of Palo Alto. He was then given command of the Fortín de la Ciudadela, the only external fort that was not taken by the Americans during the Battle of Monterrey and when General Pedro de Ampudia ordered López to hand over the fortress and he had no choice but to do so, even if he personally disagreed. He then promoted the Tolimán Plan but after being captured, he fled to the United States. When the Reform War broke out, López returned to side with the Liberals but lost a leg in combat and was taken prisoner in Guadalajara by the Conservatives. López was praised by General Pedro Ogazón for his services rendered at Jalisco. He also managed to capture the village of Camargo on November 29, 1851.

Once released on April 13, 1853, he was granted the position of Ambassador to Prussia, presenting his credentials as ambassador of Mexico to the King of Prussia, Friedrich Wilhelm IV on September 3, 1853, and on October 23, 1853, he established relations with the King of Saxony, Johann, ending his diplomatic mission on November 12, 1855. On 1857, Don Benito Juárez granted López the Islas Marías with the condition of not selling or renting them to any foreign power.

At the start of the Second French intervention in Mexico, he commanded the Army of the East. On February 9, 1862, he was removed from office and replaced by Ignacio Zaragoza. In 1864, he was the commanding general in Jalisco and general in chief of the Army of the Center but after having personal conflicts with Colonel Antonio Rojas, he returned to Mexico City. On July 26 of that year, he switched sides to side with the Second Mexican Empire. When Carlota of Mexico left for Europe to seek support for her husband, López Uraga went with her as an escort, a fact that caused him to be considered a traitor to the country and revoked his ownership of the Islas Marías.

After the victory of the Republicans and due to the Amnesty Law issued by the government of Benito Juárez, the former General López Uraga recovered ownership of the Islas Marías in 1878. The islands were then sold in 1879 to Don Manuel Carpena, a resident of Tepic, Nayarit for 45,000 pesos. Later López lived in exile, dying in San Francisco, California on February 4, 1885.
