= Battle of Atlixco (1862) =

- Part of the Second French intervention in Mexico
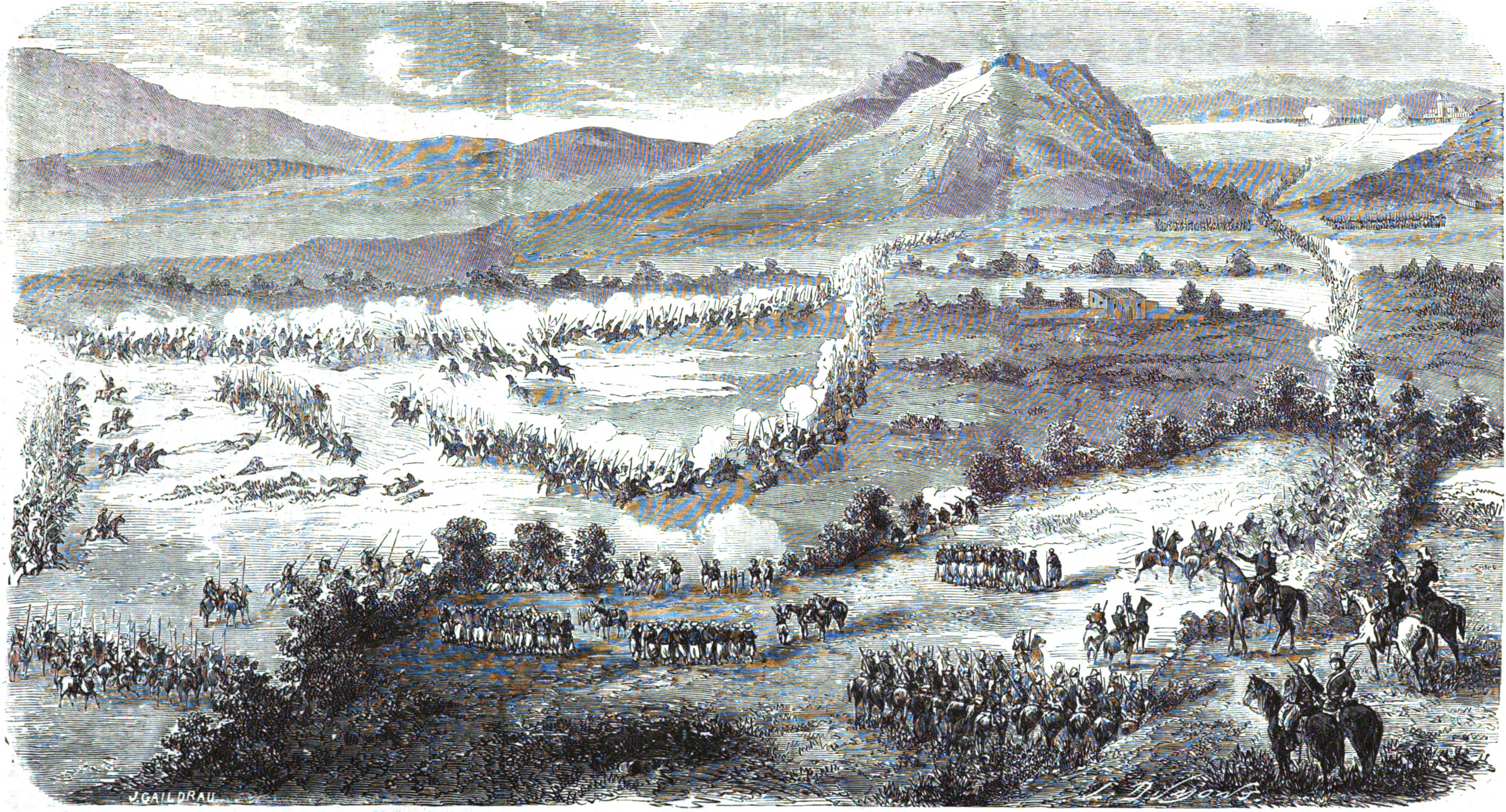
Date	4 May 1862
Location	Atlixco, Puebla 18°54′N 98°24′W
Result	Republican victory

Belligerents
Second Federal Republic of Mexico	(France) French Empire (Mexico) Second Mexican Empire

Commanders and leaders
(Mexico) Tomas O'Horan Escudero; Antonio Carvajal	(Mexico) Leonardo Márquez; José María Cobos

Strength
1,000 soldiers	1,000 soldiers

The Battle of Atlixco was fought on 4 May 1862 between the French invasion force and their Mexican imperial allies on one side and the Mexican republican forces on the other. The republicans were commanded by Tomas O'Horan, who later defected and was executed at the end of the war. The imperials were commanded by Leonardo Márquez, a veteran of the Mexican–American War and the War of Reform known as the "Tiger of Tacubaya". The two sides were evenly matched with 1,000 soldiers each. The republicans were victorious.
