= Ramón Méndez =

19th-Century Imperial Mexican general

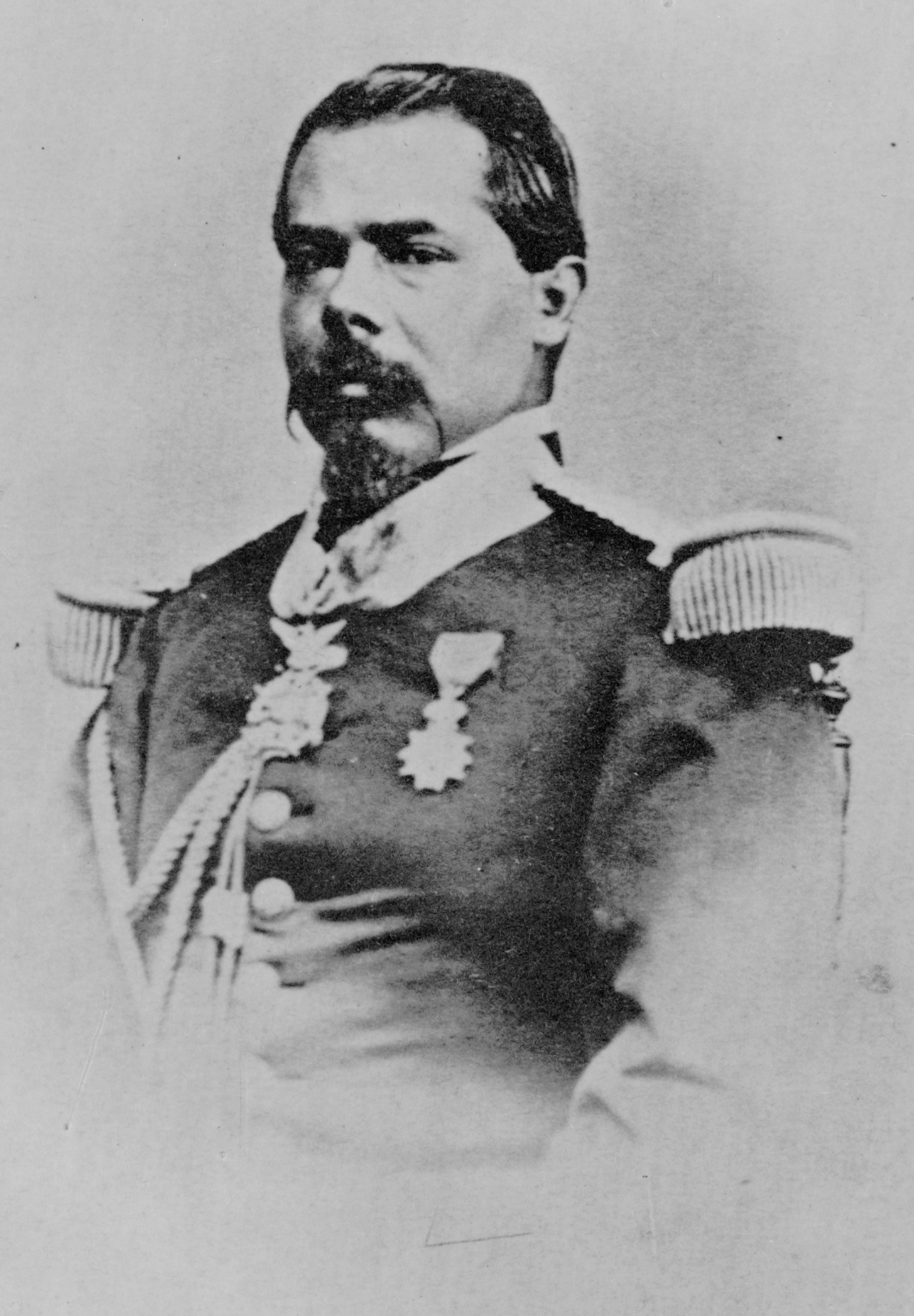
- Born: 1829; Ario, Michoacán, Mexico
- Died: 19 June 1867 (aged 37–38); Santiago de Querétaro, Querétaro, Mexico
- Military career
- Allegiance: Second Federal Republic of Mexico; Mexican Empire
- Branch: Mexican Army; Imperial Mexican Army
- Service years: 1840 – 1867
- Rank: General
- Conflicts: Ayutla Revolution; Reform War; Second Franco-Mexican War; Siege of Querétaro (executed)

Ramón Méndez (1829 – 19 June 1867) was a Mexican Imperial general who was best known for ordering the executions of Carlos Salazar Ruiz and José María Arteaga on October 21, 1865, as part of Maximilian's new Black Decree that was signed that year.

== Second French intervention in Mexico ==
Méndez was a conservative and like many Conservative military personnel, he sided with the new Second Mexican Empire. He was promoted to General and went on to participate in several battles in the war.

On October 13, he won a key victory over the Republicans at Santa Ana Amatlán in Michoacán, capturing both Carlos Salazar Ruiz and José María Arteaga. Eleven days earlier, Emperor Maximilian had ratified the "Black Decree" which would execute anyone committing guerrilla warfare against the Mexican Empire. Since Méndez deemed Ruiz and Arteaga to be leaders of the republican guerrilla forces, he ordered their executions by firing squad, along with other officers tried for the same reason.

After the executions, Méndez went on to participate in the Siege of Querétaro as he brought around 4,000 infantry as reinforcements. Méndez himself was captured during the siege and was executed on June 19, 1867, as retaliation for his executions of Republican prisoners.
