= Statue of Ignacio Vallarta (Puerto Vallarta) =

Statue in Puerto Vallarta, Jalisco, Mexico

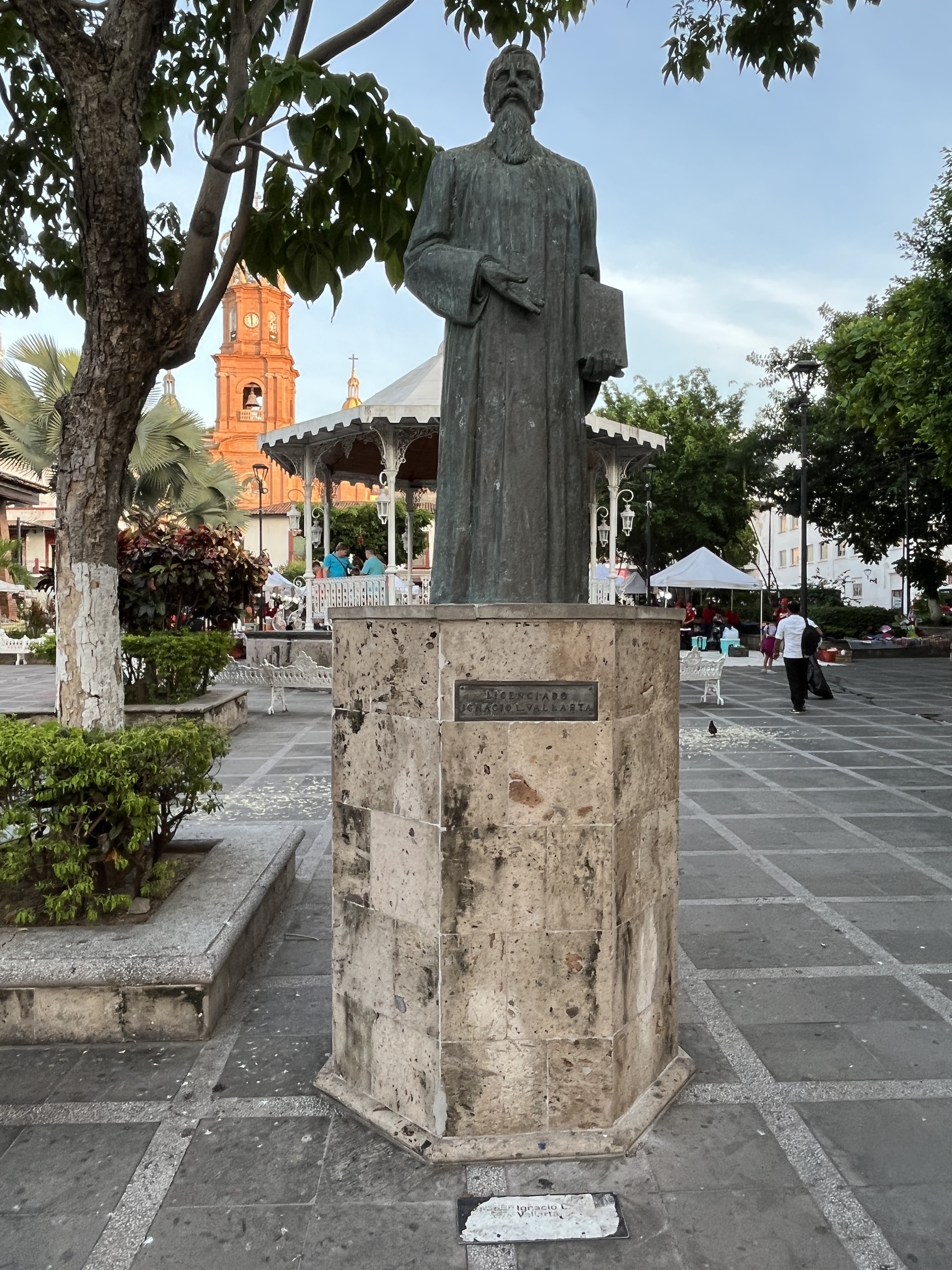
- The statue in 2022
- Medium: Bronze sculpture
- Subject: Ignacio Vallarta
- Location: Puerto Vallarta, Jalisco, Mexico; 20°36′30.9″N 105°14′8.3″W

A statue of Ignacio Vallarta is installed in Puerto Vallarta's Plaza de Armas, in the Mexican state of Jalisco.

The sculpture had previously been located at Park Aquiles Serdan. It was donated by former governor Juan Gil Preciado and was inaugurated in 1964 by then mayor Carlos Arreola Lima.

== See also ==
- Statue of Ignacio Vallarta (Guadalajara)
