= Ingenia =

Scientific classification
- Kingdom: Animalia
- Phylum: Nematoda
- Class: Chromadorea
- Order: Araeolaimida
- Family: Tripyloididae
- Genus: Ingenia; Gerlach, 1957

Type species
- Ingenia mirabilis Gerlach, 1957

Genus of roundworms

Ingenia is a genus of marine nematode worms. It belongs to the Tripyloididae, which is a group that are mostly free-living and which feed on diatoms and other algaes. It contains three known species: I. mirabilis, the type species native to Brazil; Ingenia communis, found in the Mekong Delta; and Ingenia major found in the Yellow Sea.
