= Statue of Ignacio Vallarta (Guadalajara) =

Statue in Guadalajara, Jalisco, Mexico

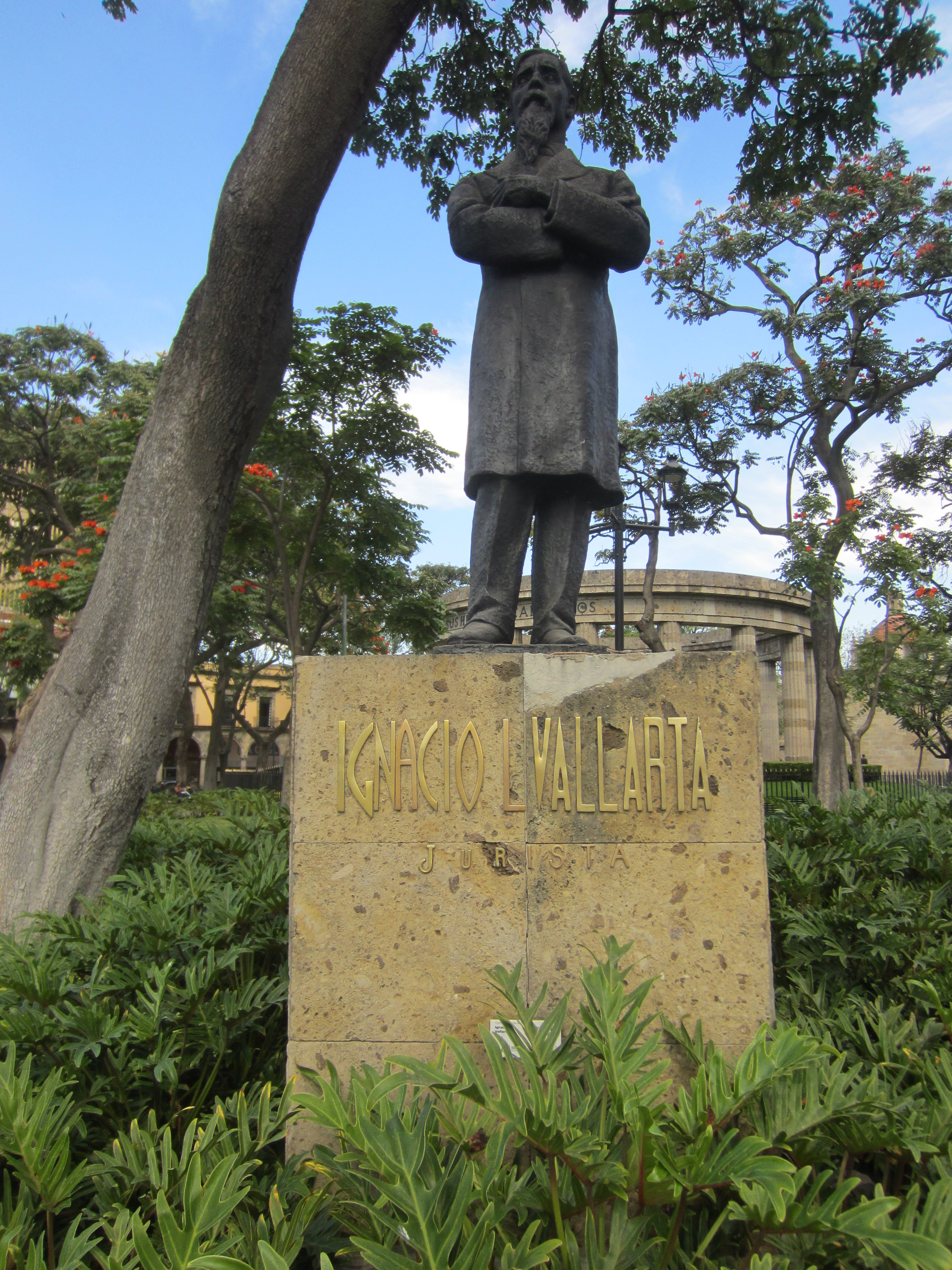
- The statue in 2021
- Subject: Ignacio Vallarta
- Location: Guadalajara, Jalisco, Mexico; 20°40′39″N 103°20′50.4″W

A statue of Ignacio Vallarta is installed along the Rotonda de los Jaliscienses Ilustres, in Centro, Guadalajara, in the Mexican state of Jalisco.

== See also ==
- Statue of Ignacio Vallarta (Puerto Vallarta)
