= Battle of Las Cumbres =

Coordinates: 18.7167°N 97.3167°W

- Part of the Second French intervention in Mexico
Date	28 April 1862
Location	Cumbres de Acultzingo
Result	French victory

Belligerents
Second Federal Republic of Mexico	French Empire

Commanders and leaders
(Mexico) Ignacio Zaragoza	(Second French Empire) Charles de Lorencez

Strength
4,000 soldiers	6,000 soldiers

Casualties and losses
50 killed 2 guns lost	2 killed 32 wounded

The Battle of Las Cumbres also known as the Battle of Acultzingo was a skirmish at the Acultzingo Pass between the French invasion force under Charles de Lorencez and Mexican republican forces under Ignacio Zaragoza. It took place on 28 April 1862. Despite holding the high ground, Zaragoza was not willing to risk his forces by engaging the French Army in the open. As the French troops seized the first line of Mexican entrenchments, Zaragoza withdrew his forces to their stronghold of Puebla.

== See also ==
- Battle of Puebla
- Siege of Puebla (1847)
- Siege of Puebla (1863)
