= Ingenio La Trinidad, Tucumán =

Coordinates: 27°24′S 65°31′W

Ingenio La Trinidad (Tucumán)
- Interactive map of Ingenio La Trinidad (Tucumán)
- Country: Argentina
- Province: Tucumán Province
- Time zone: UTC−3 (ART)

Ingenio La Trinidad (Tucumán) is a settlement in Tucumán Province in northern Argentina.
