= Leonardo Márquez =

Mexican general

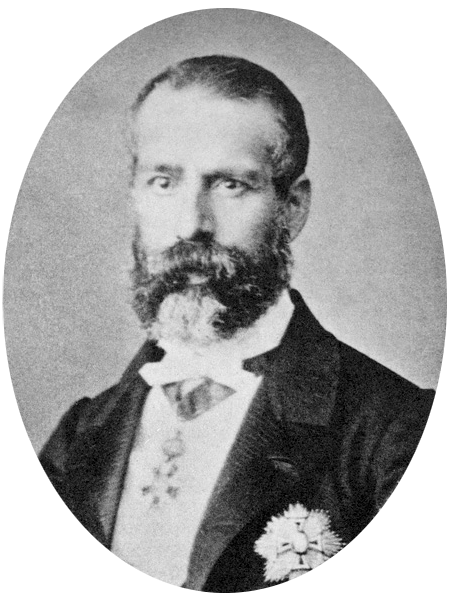

Governor of Jalisco
- In office 8 January 1859 – 20 March 1859
- Succeeded by: Luis Tapia
- In office 15 May 1859 – 28 May 1859
- Preceded by: José Quintanilla
- Succeeded by: Luis Tapia
- In office 3 September 1859 – 14 November 1859
- Preceded by: Luis Tapia
- Succeeded by: Luis Tapia

Personal details
- Born: 8 January 1820 Mexico City
- Died: 5 June 1913 (aged 93) Havana, Cuba
- Party: Conservative
- Occupation: Military, Political and Diplomatic
- Awards: Order of Guadalupe
- Nickname: The Tiger of Tacubaya

Military service
- Allegiance: (Mexico) Conservatives (Mexico) Imperialists
- Battles/wars: Mexican-American War; Battle of La Angostura; Ayutla Revolt; Three Years' War; Battle of Guadalajara; Battle of Tacubaya; Battle of Estancia de las Vacas; Battle of Calpulalpan; French Intervention; Battle of Atlixco; Battle of Barranca Seca; Siege of Puebla; Capture of Morelia; Battle of 2 de Abril; Battle of San Lorenzo; Siege of Querétaro

Leonardo Márquez Araujo (8 January 1820 – 5 July 1913) was a conservative Mexican general. He led forces in opposition to the Liberals led by Benito Juárez, but following defeat in the Reform War was forced to guerrilla warfare. Later, he helped the French in their intervention to help restore the conservative cause. However, their defeat forced him into exile for most of the rest of his life.

== Career ==
He fought against the United States in the Mexican–American War of 1846 to 1848 and was a prominent supporter of conservative General Antonio López de Santa Anna in the revolutionary movement of 1849. After the fall of Santa Anna in the 1854–55 Revolution of Ayutla that brought the liberals to power, Márquez supported the conservative government in the Reform War (1858–60) against the liberal government of Benito Juárez. With Miguel Miramón, the leading general of the conservatives, Márquez initially found success against the liberal army, but the tide turned in 1860, and the liberals won on the battle field. He was called "The Tiger of Tacubaya", alluding to the Battle of Tacubaya (11 April 1859) and the Massacre of Tacubaya, where he ordered liberal officers and some medical personnel to be executed. Márquez pursued guerrilla warfare in the Sierra Gorda after the defeat of the conservatives on the battlefield; he is blamed for the murders of the prominent liberals Melchor Ocampo and General Leandro Valle.

In 1862, he supported the conservatives' invitation to Maximilian Habsburg to become the emperor of Mexico, although he did not participate in conservative politicians' plans for it. He did join the French forces under General Charles de Lorencez in the initial invasion. In 1864, Márquez was given a mission to Constantinople. Meanwhile, in Mexico, the war led by the French was turning as Liberals were starting to win back their territory and the French emperor was now considering the pros and cons of the war in general.

In October 1866, Maximilian made him a division commander of forces around Mexico City, but he was unaware that Márquez was causing dissension by forced conscription (leva) of troops and exacting protection money from residents of the capital. French general Bazaine condemned Márquez's methods of recruitment. In March 1867, Maximilian sent him to Mexico City to form a cabinet and raise troops for the relief of Querétaro, which was then under siege. Márquez was a rival of Miguel Miramón and disagreed with him frequently. Miramón had proposed an assault on the republican army while they were divided, but Márquez opposed the idea, possibly only because Miramón had suggested it. He joined Maximilian at Querétaro, and broke through the besiegers and almost reached the state capital. He was defeated before he could reach the city and returned to Mexico City, where he was besieged by liberal General Porfirio Díaz. He made his way to Mexico City for the purpose of organizing a force to relieve the Emperor. Finding that to be impossible, he conceived the plan of setting up an independent government of his own in the southern states, with the city of Puebla as its capital, in order to continue the conservative cause which seemingly, along with the French, looked to be collapsing.

However, it was too late and the emperor was captured on 21 June 1867, and Márquez, after remaining in concealment for several months, made his way to Vera Cruz and then to Havana, while Maximilian and dedicated conservative generals Miguel Miramón and Tomás Mejía were executed by firing squad in Querétaro.

He was expressly excluded from the Juárez's amnesty of 1870. He was allowed to return to Mexico in 1895, but returned to Cuban exile in 1901 due to his continuing unpopularity. He continued to defend his role in the Empire, and lived long enough to see start of the Mexican Revolution and the fall of Porfirio Díaz, who had played such a key role in the defeat of the Empire forty years earlier. Márquez died in Havana in 1913 at the age of 93.
