= Ignacio Vallarta =

Mexican politician (1830–1893)

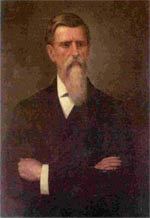
Ignacio Vallarta.

Ignacio Luis Vallarta Ogazón (25 August 1830, Guadalajara, Jalisco – 31 December 1893, Mexico, D.F.) was a Mexican jurist and governor of the Mexican state of Jalisco (1872–1876). His baptismal name was José Luis Miguel Ignacio Vallarta Ogazón.

Vallarta graduated from the University of Guadalajara with a law degree in 1854 and started to practice law the following year. He quickly became involved in the political struggle in Jalisco between liberalism, represented by Jalisco Governor Santos Degollado, and traditionalism, represented by Bishop Pedro Espinosa of Guadalajara. In 1856, Vallarta became private secretary of Governor Degollado. Vallarta and Degollado participated in the Constituent Congress of 1856-57 as delegates for Jalisco.

Vallarta fought in the Reform War on the side of Benito Juárez, attending the convention that drafted the 1857 Constitution of Mexico. He was also an ally of Juárez during the French Intervention in Mexico, and went into exile in the US from 1864 until 1866.

He served in Juárez's cabinet after the restoration, but resigned in 1868 because of disagreements with Juárez's foreign minister Sebastián Lerdo de Tejada.

He was elected governor of his native state of Jalisco in 1871. During his governorship he was responsible for rebuilding the Government Palace, passage of the Public Education Law of 1874, and finishing work on the state penitentiary. He declined re-election when his term ended in 1876.

In 1876 he was named Foreign Minister under Porfirio Díaz. In 1877 he was named President of the Supreme Court of Mexico, an office which he served concurrently with his role as Foreign Minister. He resigned from these positions in 1882, retiring into private law practice until his death in 1893.

Ignacio Vallarta's remains are interred at the Rotonda de las Personas Ilustres in Mexico City. The Mexican resort city of Puerto Vallarta is named after him, as is Av. Vallarta, one of the main roads through central Guadalajara.

== Honors ==
There are two statues honoring Vallarta in Jalisco, one in Puerto Vallarta and the other in Guadalajara.

== Sources ==
Cuadernos del Instituto de Investigaciones Jurídicas: a cien años de la muerte de Vallarta Mexico, DF (1994) UNAM Press - collection with several essays on the juridical legacy of Ignacio Vallarta. Available online at the Biblioteca Jurídica. (In Spanish)

González Navarro, Moisés - Trascendencia histórica de la obra de Vallarta in Cuadernos del Instituto de Investigaciones Jurídicas: a cien años de la muerte de Vallarta

Madrazo, Jorge - Ignacio Vallarta y la pena de muerte in Cuadernos del Instituto de Investigaciones Jurídicas: a cien años de la muerte de Vallarta

Río Rodríguez, Carlos del - Vallarta: hombre universal in Cuadernos del Instituto de Investigaciones Jurídicas: a cien años de la muerte de Vallarta
