= Battle of Loma Alta =

1860 battle of the Mexican Reform War

- Part of the Reform War
Date	24 April 1860
Location	Loma Alta, Zacatecas
Result	Liberal victory

Belligerents
Liberals	Conservatives

Commanders and leaders
José López Uraga	Rómulo Díaz de la Vega

The Battle of Loma Alta took place on 24 April 1860 in the vicinity of Loma Alta in the state of Zacatecas, Mexico, between elements of the liberal army of the National Guard of San Luis Potosí and Zacatecas, under General Jose Lopez Uraga and elements of the conservative army commanded by General Romulo Diaz De La Vega during the War of Reform.

== Battle ==
While Miguel Miramón was developing attacked Veracruz, Jesús González Ortega was forming in the state of Durango an army to attack the states of Zacatecas and San Luis Potosí. At the same time, the liberal generals Pedro Antonio Rojas Ogazón and had mastered the state of Colima and Jalisco south, threatening the city of Guadalajara. After the victory of General Uraga in Alta Loma, San Luis Potosí took and prepared to march towards the Bajio. The battle ended as liberal victory taking prisoner to the general Rómulo Diaz de la Vega and his entire army.
