= Pedro Ogazón =

Mexican Liberal politician and general

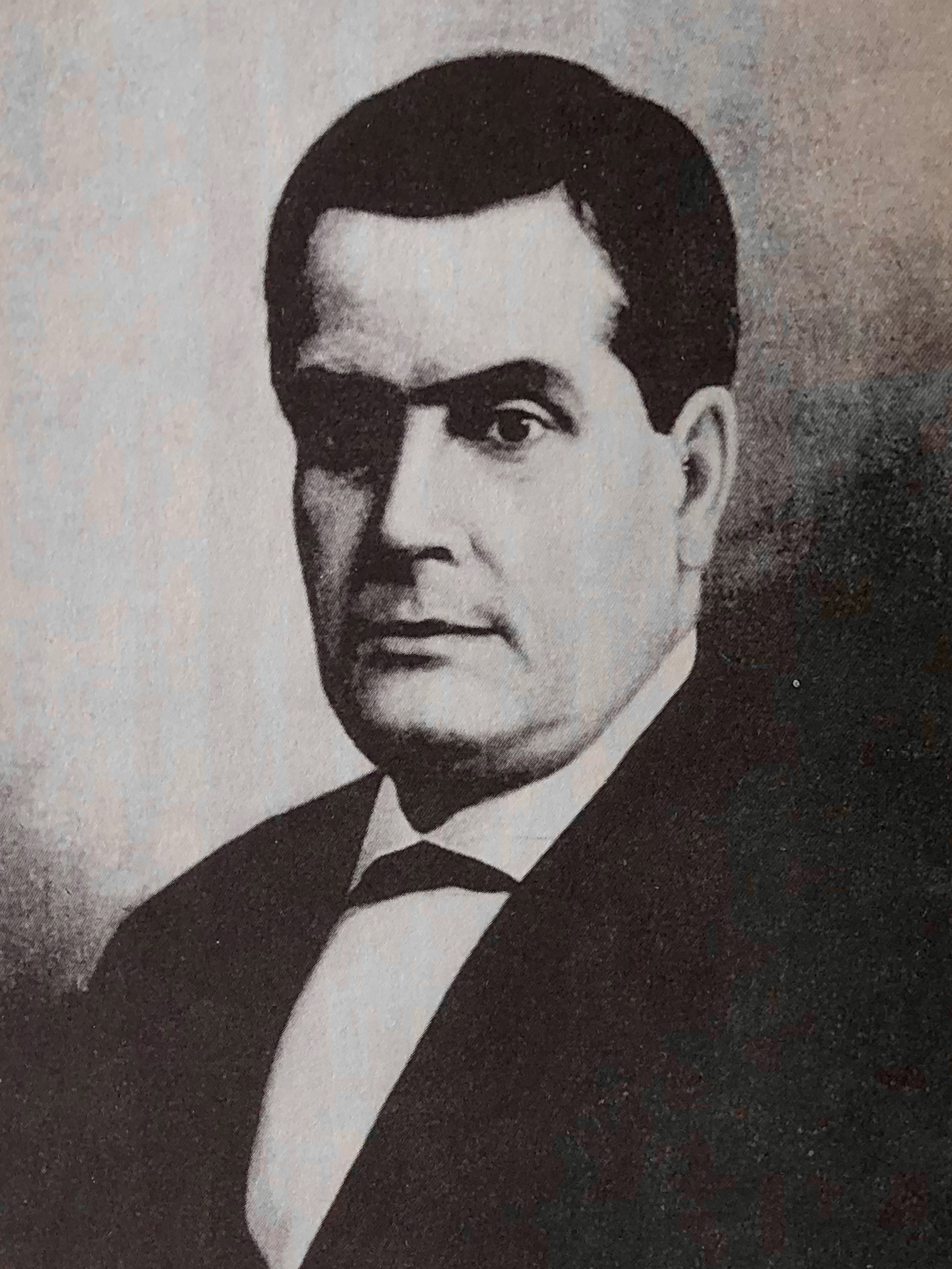
Pedro Ogazon Rubio

Pedro Ogazón Rubio (Guadalajara, Jalisco; November 17, 1820 – Orizaba, Veracruz; February 27, 1890) was a Mexican military officer and politician. He served as the governor of Jalisco, Minister of War, a local and federal deputy, and a magistrate of the Supreme Court of Justice.

== U.S. intervention and Ayutla Revolution ==
He completed his studies in Guadalajara and earned a law degree in 1846. During the Mexican-American War in 1847, he participated in the defence of Guadalajara as part of the Terán battalion of the National Guard.

In 1855, he was the general secretary of the government under José Santos Degollado. During the Ayutla Revolution, he sided with the liberals and was promoted to the rank of colonel. He served as a deputy during the Constituent Congress that drafted the 1857 Constitution.

== Reform War and French intervention ==
Ogazón participated on the liberal side in the Reform War and distinguished himself in the Battle of Guadalajara, defeating the conservative general Severo Castillo. At the behest of President Benito Juárez, Ogazón became the interim governor of the state of Jalisco in 1858, until the arrival of the conservatives. In 1859, Degollado appointed him Brigadier General of the First Division of Jalisco, and in 1860, he was named commander of the Central Division.

At the end of the Reform War, Pedro Ogazón was elected governor, a position he held until 1862. During these two years, he left his cousin and general secretary Ignacio Vallarta in charge while he fought Manuel Lozada, "the Tiger of Álica," on multiple occasions. His mission was interrupted during the Second French Intervention in Mexico, leading him to sign the Pochotitlán treaties with Lozada. He defended the port of Mazatlán in the eponymous Battle of Mazatlán in 1864 after returning from San Francisco with weapons for the defense. During the French intervention, he traveled constantly between San Francisco and New York, acting as an agent to secure financial support and armaments. From May 1866, he returned to Mexico and served under General Silvestre Aranda, participating in the Siege of Querétaro in 1867.

With the restored Republic, he became a magistrate of the Supreme Court of Justice of the Nation from 1868 to 1874.

== Tuxtepec Rebellion ==
In 1876, he was promoted to division general under Porfirio Díaz, supporting him in the Tuxtepec Revolution against the reelection of Sebastián Lerdo de Tejada. He distinguished himself in the Battle of Tecoac.

As a reward for his services, he was appointed Minister of War and Navy in the first Cabinets of Porfirio Díaz and Juan N. Méndez, from November 1876 to April 1878. From that year until 1883, he was once again a magistrate of the Supreme Court of Justice. After his term, he retired from public life.

== Personal life ==
One of his aunts, Juana Ogazón Velázquez, was the mother of General and Governor of Nuevo León Bernardo Reyes; the other, Isabel Ogazón Velázquez, was the mother of lawyer Ignacio Vallarta.

He married Rosa Escobar in 1872, and they had two children, Margarita (1875–1920) and Pedro (1873–1929). The latter adopted the artistic name Pedro Luis Ogazón, becoming one of the most prominent pianists of his time and a teacher of the celebrated Carlos Chávez.

Due to health problems, Pedro Ogazón Rubio retired first to Cuernavaca, and later to Orizaba, where he died on February 27, 1890. He was buried in the Rotonda de las Personas Ilustres.
