= Charles de Lorencez =

French general (1814–1892)

Charles Ferdinand Latrille, Comte de Lorencez
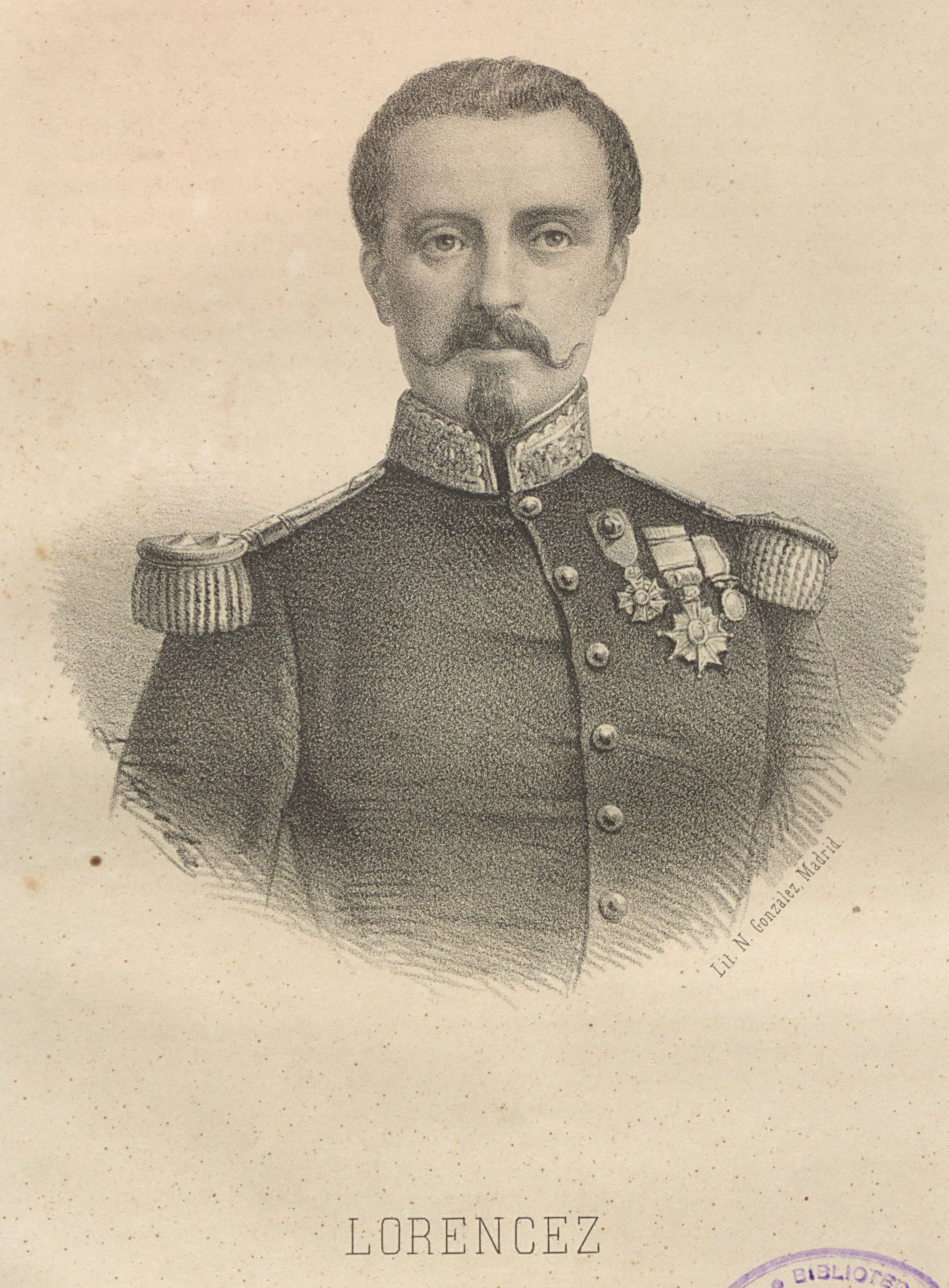
- Born: 23 May 1814; Paris, France
- Died: 16 July 1892 (aged 78); Château Laas
- Relatives: Charlotte of Belgium
- Military career
- Allegiance: Second French Empire
- Branch: French Army
- Service years: 1832–1872 (ESM (1830–1832))
- Rank: Army General
- Conflicts: French conquest of Algeria Crimean War: Battle of Malakoff; French intervention in Mexico: Battle of Las Cumbres; Battle of Puebla; Franco-Prussian War: Battle of Borny-Colombey; Battle of Gravelotte

Charles Ferdinand Latrille, Comte de Lorencez (23 May 1814 –16 July 1892) was a French Army general under Napoleon III during the 19th century. He was a relative of the Empress Carlota of Mexico, who was the only daughter of King Leopold I, King of the Belgians and wife of Maximilian I of Mexico. He was most notable for losing the Battle of Puebla in the early stages of the Second French intervention in Mexico (ultimately culminating in the Second Mexican Empire) although he would continue to have military command during France's war with Prussia.

== Early career ==
Lorencez was born in Paris to a minor noble family. His parents were Caroline Nicolette Oudinot de Reggio and Guillaume Latrille de Lorencez, a veteran of the French Revolutionary wars and the Napoleonic Wars, making the young Lorencez the grandson of Marshal Oudinot. He studied at the military academy of Saint-Cyr, one of France’s most prestigious military schools, from 1830 to 1832, graduating as a third sous-lieutenant at age 18. He later became a captain in 1840 before he served first in Algeria in charge of the 3e chasseurs à pied, specialized light infantry sent to handle skirmishes in the country's rough terrain. In 1845, his men were put under the command of lieutenant-colonel Aimable Pélissier, a future marshal who operated at the time in the west of the town of Dahra controversially helping to kill Algerian combatants and civilians in the Dahra caves creating a scandal in France. Lorencez was then wounded and mentioned in several dispatches being distinguished notably at the Siege of Zaatcha in 1849 serving under colonel Canrobert, another future French marshal, commanding the 1er battalion of Zouaves helping the decisive end of the bloody siege. He was then promoted to Lieutenant-Colonel commanding the 7e de Ligne at age 35. On his return to France, Lorencez was promoted to the rank of colonel of the 49e de ligne in 1852, the year that Napoleon III seized power and proclaimed himself Emperor of the Second French Empire, but Lorencez would be a staunch Bonapartist for most of his career. In 1855, at the Battle of Malakoff during the Crimean War, he commanded a brigade in 5th division of 2nd corps where they were pushed back in ferocious fighting against the Russians at the Bastion du Mat. However, the French managed to take Malakoff leading to the fall of Sevastopol and the 41 year old general caught the eye of the Emperor. Lorencez was sent back to France to recover, commanding French forces in stationary and peace command in France from 1855 to 1861 and inherited his recently deceased father’s estate and titles.

== French expedition to Mexico ==
Lorencez then served in the French intervention in Mexico where he won a commission to major general in March 1862, given senior command of French expeditionary forces by Napoleon III. He established his headquarters in Orizaba where he won skirmishes with Mexican forces at the Acultzingo Summit taking the high ground and persuading them to withdraw, afterwards proclaiming victory and triumph back to the minister of war in Paris famously saying, "We have over the Mexicans such a superiority of race, organization, discipline, morality, and elevated spirits that I beg you to inform the Emperor that, from this moment on and at the head of six thousand soldiers, I am the master of Mexico."

=== Battle of Puebla ===
He led his forces in a headlong advance deep into Mexico. In a fast pursuit, Lorencez fought at the Battle of Puebla, on 5 May 1862, where the French troops under his command were defeated by Mexican troops led by General Ignacio Zaragoza as result of poor tactics and overconfidence. Lorencez retreated towards Orizaba under constant pursuit by Mexican forces although the skill and tactics of the army itself prevented a total rout and in fact made the attempted siege useless. Criticized by the Emperor himself and disgraced, the general left Veracruz on 17 December 1862, denied his desires to stay and fight in charge of 2e division. General Forey would replace him, although Lorencez did consider him a close friend and a father figure. During the rest of the war, Lorencez would be one of many pressuring the Emperor to recall the expedition warning him of a potential disaster.

== Franco-Prussian War ==
Back in France, Lorencez was made Grand Officier de la Légion d'Honneur in 1866, but still in disgrace, he was only inspector general from 1864-1870.

When the Franco-Prussian War broke out in 1870, Lorencez at first in charge of a garrison in Toulouse until the 56 year old general was transferred into command of a wartime division, similar in size, 6,000 men, to his previous army in Mexico. His 3rd division was part of IV corps, part of the Army of the Rhine which saw no real action at the beginning of the war. Later, the corps fell under the command of Marshal François Bazaine in his senior role over the Rhine armies.

His division finally saw action at Borny, a French tactical victory, on 14 August, where he helped reinforce the French left wing later helping to take back Nouilly thus stretching the Prussian’s right wing contributing their withdrawal. However, when his division was last to arrive near the battlefield at Lessy, Lorencez division was not present for the Battle of Mars-la-Tour just 2 days later. On the 18th, Lorencez was captured during the massive Battle of Gravelotte, the biggest battle of the war, strongly defending the French center, south of Saint-Privat, at Amanvillers and inflicting heavy casualties on the repulsed elite Prussian Guard and 9th corps, part of Bazaine's breakout attempts before the Siege of Metz (1870).

== Retirement and death ==
His contraction of yellow fever in Mexico compelled him to retire from active service two years later.

He later died in his recently acquired Château de Laàs, which he gained in 1885 through his wife's noble connections, and on 16 July 1892 and left behind a son Etienne Latrille de Lorencez and another daughter, Germaine Latrille de Lorencez and his wife Euphémie Caroline M Pouyanne. He also left his mistress, the Comtesse Emilia Alvarez de Perez and their daughter the Comtesse Emilia Latrille de Lorencez. His home of Château de Laàs would continue to have Lorencez's flag carved into it.

== Assessment ==
Lorencez established himself as a courageous and ambitious career soldier. He studied military tactics and rose to prominence during the French empire. He was entrusted with independent command in Mexico, but his limitations as senior commander began to show as he was overconfident of his forces. He led a daring strike into the heart of Mexico intending to take the capital but his quick and stubborn assault on Puebla led to disaster. Lorencez was disgraced and robbed of a chance to possibly receive a marshal's baton. However, the general performed at his best once more in the Franco-Prussian war and at Gravelotte, his division, along with IV corps' other divisions took on the main Prussian assault by Saint-Privat and their lines held against merciless Prussian assaults.

Lorencez rose up the ranks of French command as a brave and ambitious soldier, but fell short of independent senior command like his other peers of the age.

== See also ==
- Battle of Puebla
- Cinco de Mayo
