= 1862 in Mexico =

- Decades: 1840s; 1850s; 1860s; 1870s; 1880s
- See also: History of Mexico; List of years in Mexico; Timeline of Mexican history

Events in the year 1862 in Mexico.

== Incumbents ==
=== President and Cabinet ===
- President: Benito Juárez
- Interior Secretary (SEGOB): Jesus Teran then Manuel Doblado

=== Governors ===
- Aguascalientes: José Ma. Chávez Alonso
- Campeche: Pablo García Montilla
- Chiapas: Juan Clímaco Corzo/José Gabriel Esquinca
- Chihuahua: Luis Terrazas
- Coahuila: Santiago Vidaurri
- Colima: Urbano Gómez/Salvador Brihuega/Manuel F. Toro/Florencio Villareal/Manuel F. Toro/Julio Garcia/Ramón R. De la Vega
- Durango:
- Guanajuato:
- Guerrero:
- Jalisco: Ignacio Luis Vallarta/Pedro Ogazón/Manuel Doblado/Jesús López Portillo
- State of Mexico:
- Michoacán:
- Nuevo León: Santiago Vidaurri
- Oaxaca:
- Puebla:
- Querétaro: Zeferino Macías/Zeferino Macías/Ignacio Echegaray/José Linares/José María Arteaga
- San Luis Potosí:
- Sinaloa:
- Sonora:
- Tabasco:
- Tamaulipas: Jesús de la Serna/Ignacio Comonfort/Albino López/Juan B. Troconis
- Veracruz: Ignacio de la Llave y Segura Zevallos
- Yucatán:
- Zacatecas:

== Events ==
- April 19 – Battle of Fortín
- April 28 – Battle of Las Cumbres
- May 4 – Battle of Atlixco
- May 5 – Battle of Puebla
- May 18 – Battle of Barranca Seca
- June 13 – Battle of Cerro del Borrego.

== Deaths ==
- March 23 – Manuel Robles Pezuela
- September 8 – Ignacio Zaragoza
