= Monument to Ignacio Zaragoza =

Sculpture in Puebla, Mexico

- Monumento a Ignacio Zaragoza
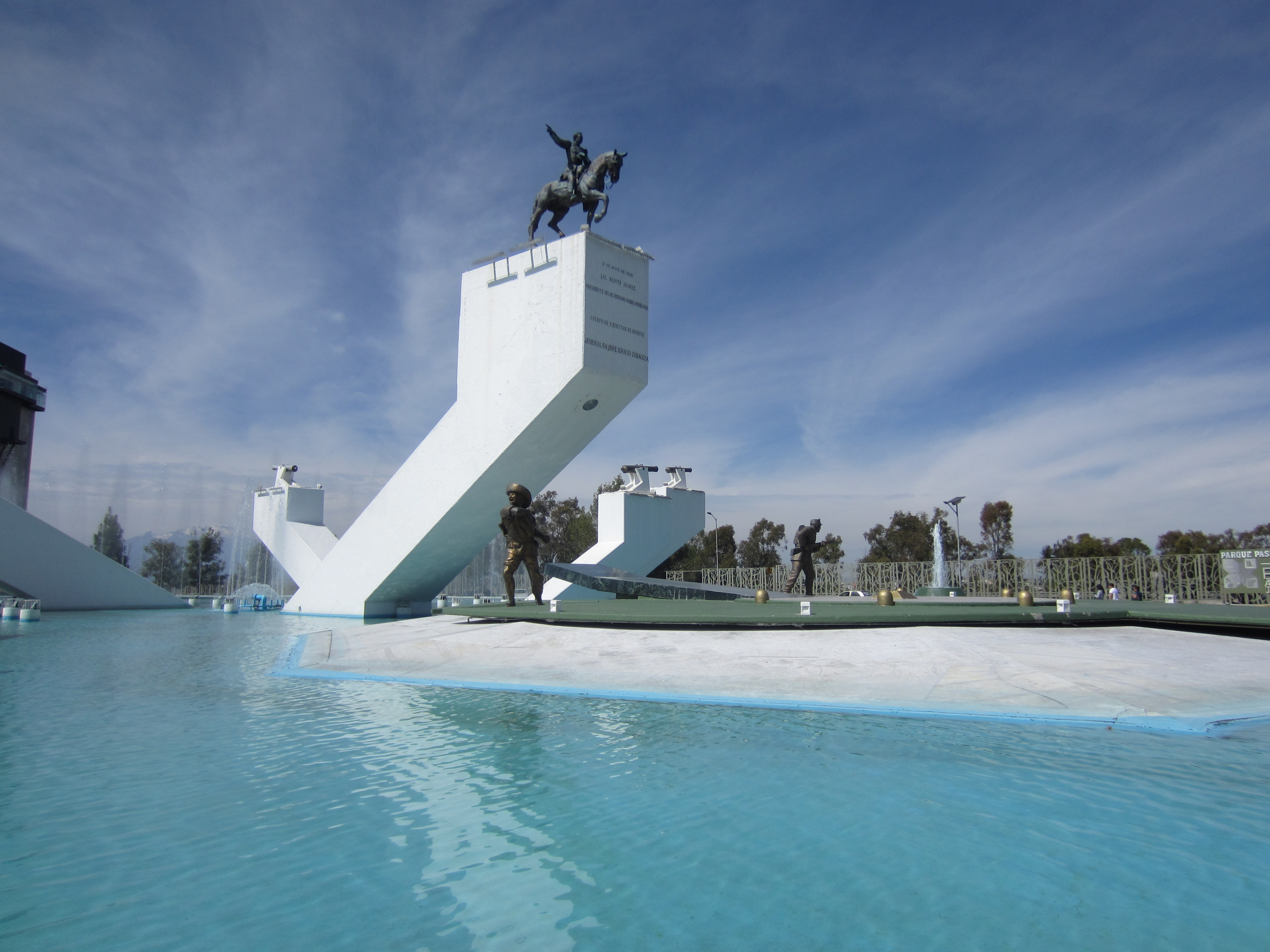
- The monument in 2018
- Interactive map of Monument to Ignacio Zaragoza
- Location: Puebla de Zaragoza, Puebla, Mexico
- Coordinates: 19°3′38″N 98°11′4″W
- Designer: Jesús Fructuoso Contreras
- Type: Mausoleum
- Dedicated to: Ignacio Zaragoza

The Monument to Ignacio Zaragoza, also known as The Mausoleum of Ignacio Zaragoza, is a prominent monument in Puebla, Mexico. A monumental fountain and mausoleum, it serves as both a commemorative tribute and final resting place to General Ignacio Zaragoza, military officer that lead the Mexican Army to victory against invading French troops at the Battle of Puebla on May 5, 1862.

It is situated in the historic Zona Cívica de los Fuertes (Civic Zone of the Forts), on the northeastern edge of Puebla. Near the hilltop forts of Loreto and Guadalupe where the battle took place.

== Description ==
The centerpiece is a massive equestrian statue of Zaragoza. He is depicted in full military uniform, with his right index finger pointing toward Fort Loreto. The statue is elevated on a tall pedestal (reaching about 25 meters in total). Five shorter pedestals each holding a battle-used cannon have inscribed in them the names of soldiers that served under Zaragoza during battle. They are surrounded by a grand fountain and architectural base. The base includes decorative elements, most notably two statues of battle-ready soldiers.

== History ==
The monument's origins trace back to the late 19th century. Being commissioned by then Governor Mucio P. Martínez on May 5, 1895, at the southwest corner of the now-defunct Plazuela de las Piadosas to mark the start of the newly constructed road to the Forts of Loreto and Guadalupe.The equestrian statue was design by renown sculptor Jesús Fructuoso Contreras. The bronze casting was carried out by his foundry the Fundición Artística Mexicana in Mexico City. The completed work, which at the time was simply the sculpture atop of a granite base was unveiled by President Porfirio Díaz on November 22, 1896. The current mausoleum form emerged in the 1970s, at the behest of governor, Alfredo Toxqui Fernández de Lara. The project was coordinated by architect Ricardo Hernández Franco, with Víctor Manuel Terán Bonilla serving as the project resident and principal designer. The existing equestrian statue was reutilized and elevated on a new pedestal, transforming the site into a combined monument and mausoleum.

== Mausoleum ==
In 1976, to commemorate the 114th anniversary of the Battle of Puebla, then president Luis Echeverría issue a decree, published in the Diario Oficial de la Federación, authorizing the exhumation and transfer of Zaragoza's remains from the Panteón de San Fernando in Mexico City to Puebla The transfer occurred with full military honors on May 5 of that year. The remains of his wife Rafaela Padilla de la Garza were added in 1979.
