= 1867 in Mexico =

- Decades: 1840s; 1850s; 1860s; 1870s; 1880s
- See also: History of Mexico; List of years in Mexico; Timeline of Mexican history

In 1867, the Second Mexican Empire collapsed, marking the consolidation of the Mexican Republic and the victory of the Liberal government. Emperor Maximilian I, after losing the support of the French army and failing to secure sufficient military backing within Mexico, remained in power until he was captured at Querétaro along with his leading generals. He was subsequently tried and sentenced to death despite international appeals for clemency.

The defeat of the Imperial forces was carried out by Liberal commanders including Porfirio Díaz, who captured Puebla, and Mariano Escobedo, who took Querétaro. On 15 July 1867, constitutional president Benito Juárez returned to Mexico City, bringing the Second French Intervention to an end.

== Incumbents ==
- President: Benito Juárez
- Archbishop of Mexico: Pelagio Antonio de Labastida y Dávalos

=== Governors ===
- Aguascalientes: Jesús Gómez Portugal
- Campeche: Pablo García Montilla
- Chiapas:
- Chihuahua: Luis Terrazas
- Coahuila: Andrés S. Viesca Bagües/Juan Antonio Claudio de la Fuente Cárdenas/Andrés S. Viesca Bagües/Antonio Valdés Carrillo/Andrés S. Viesca Bagües
- Colima: José Maria Mendoza/Ramón R. De la Vega
- Durango:
- Guanajuato:
- Guerrero:
- Jalisco:
- State of Mexico:
- Michoacán: Justo Mendoza/Rafael Carrillo
- Nuevo León: Manuel Z. Gómez/Jerónimo Treviño
- Oaxaca:
- Puebla:
- Querétaro: Manuel Domínguez y Quintanar/Julio M. Cervantes
- San Luis Potosí:
- Sinaloa:
- Sonora:
- Tabasco:
- Tamaulipas: Governors from the Northern and Central District
- Veracruz: Francisco Hernández y Hernández
- Yucatán:
- Zacatecas:

== Events ==
=== January ===
- In January 1867, President Benito Juárez established his government in Durango.
- January 1 - Maximilian I spent the New Year in Puebla while returning to the capital after abandoning plans to leave Mexico.
- January 5 - Maximilian I arrived at the Hacienda de la Teja, near Mexico City, and requested that no official reception be held. The previous day, the imperial government's official newspaper had published a proclamation by the emperor that caused concern among his supporters in the capital. The text included the statement that he bore the Trigarante flag and would die, if necessary, for the independence and freedom of the nation.
- January 7 - Maximilian I met with Marshal Bazaine at the Hacienda de la Teja, where Bazaine advised him to abdicate the throne.
- January 7 - Republican general Ramón Corona and his forces passed through the territory of Tepic without resistance. Manuel Lozada, who had previously supported the Empire, had declared neutrality in December 1866 following the withdrawal of French troops from Sinaloa and the anticipated Republican victory.
- January 9 - Jesús González Ortega was arrested in Zacatecas by General Auza on the orders of Benito Juárez.
- January 10 - Napoleon III ordered the withdrawal of French forces from Mexico, together with Austrian and Belgian troops and civilians who wished to leave as Liberal forces advanced.
- January 11 – Benito Juárez becomes Mexican president again in an era called the Restored Republic.
- January 13 - the first 700 French soldiers embarked at Veracruz.
- January 14 - a meeting of imperial advisers was held at the National Palace in the absence of Maximilian I, owing to the political and military situation. The meeting was presided over by Teodosio Lares, president of the Supreme Court of Justice. During the session, Marshal Achille Bazaine presented abdication as the only viable course for the emperor. The bishops withdrew their support for the Empire, while the imperial ministers continued to express confidence in defeating the Republican forces and restoring order.
- January 14 - Ramón Corona captured Guadalajara, which had been defended by Mexican and French Imperial forces under the command of Ignacio Gutiérrez.
- January 18 - General Ramón Corona began organizing the Liberal administration in Jalisco and appointed Antonio Gómez Cuervo as interim governor and military commander of the state.
- January 21 - Maximilian I returned to Mexico City.
- January 22 - Benito Juárez arrived in Zacatecas from Durango as he advanced toward central Mexico.
- January 27, Miguel Miramón launched a surprise attack on Zacatecas, where Juárez and the Republican government were based, and succeeded in capturing the city. Juárez escaped on horseback and narrowly avoided capture. He later stated that a delay of fifteen minutes would have resulted in his arrest by Miramón.[10][11]

=== February ===
- February 1 - The Republican army under General Mariano Escobedo engaged the Imperial forces commanded by Miguel Miramón at a site known as the Hacienda de San Jacinto, in Aguascalientes. The battle ended in a decisive Republican victory. Following the engagement, Miramón's brother Joaquín and thirty-eight French soldiers were executed. The remaining Imperial troops withdrew to Querétaro.
- February 5 - The last French expeditionary forces, under the command of Marshal Achille Bazaine, left Mexico City on the orders of Napoleon III, depriving Maximilian I of the military support on which the Empire had depended.
- February 10 - General Porfirio Díaz rejected an invitation from Maximilian I to join the Imperial cause.
- February 13 - At seven o’clock in the morning, Emperor Maximilian I departed for Querétaro accompanied by General Leonardo Márquez, Colonel Miguel López, and 4,000 troops.
- February 17 - From San Juan del Río, Maximilian I issued a proclamation to the Imperial Mexican army stating that he would henceforth assume personal command, declaring himself free from the pressure previously exerted by the French. He also appointed General Leonardo Márquez as his chief of staff. At the same time, the Republican government ordered the movement of the Army of the West under Ramón Corona, together with the forces of Generals Vicente Riva Palacio and Nicolás Régules from the Army of the Centre, toward Querétaro in support of Mariano Escobedo.
- February 19 - Maximilian I establishes himself in the city of Querétaro.
- February 22 - In Querétaro, Maximilian I and his generals held a council of war to determine their strategy. It was agreed that the Imperial army would leave the city on the 26th of that month to engage the Republican forces, a course of action that may have prevented the subsequent siege. The plan was not carried out, however, and Maximilian remained in Querétaro rather than launching the attack.

=== March ===
- March 6 - Twenty-five thousand Republican troops arrived in the vicinity of Querétaro in preparation for the siege of Maximilian I and the Imperial army.
- March 9 - The Republican army, commanded by General Porfirio Díaz, laid siege to the Imperial forces in Puebla. Díaz established his headquarters on Cerro de San Juan, while the Imperial defenders held the forts of Loreto and Guadalupe.
- March 14 - From San Luis Potosí, Juárez issued a circular to the inhabitants of the republic urging that no agreements be made with those regarded as traitors to the nation in exchange for exemption from punishment, in the context of the anticipated Republican victory.
- March 14 - The Republican forces launched their first assault on Querétaro but were unable to take the city.
- March 22 - During the night, General Leonardo Márquez and Santiago Vidaurri departed Querétaro to seek reinforcements in the capital in an effort to break the siege. They did not return.
- March 31 - While inspecting a house in Puebla, General Porfirio Díaz was trapped by the collapse of the roof. Republican troops recovered him and returned him to command during the ongoing operations against the Imperial forces.

=== April ===
- April 2 – Third Battle of Puebla

=== June ===
- June 19 – A firing squad executes Emperor Maximilian of Mexico.

== Notable deaths ==
- June 19
  - Maximilian I of Mexico, 2nd emperor of Mexico, 1864-1867; executed (b. 1832)
  - Tomás Mejía, general; executed (b. 1820)
  - Miguel Miramón, substitute president from 1859 to 1860 (b. 1832), executed.
- August 21 – Juan Álvarez, interim president of Mexico in 1855 (b. 1790)
