= 1864 in Mexico =

- Decades: 1840s; 1850s; 1860s; 1870s; 1880s
- See also: History of Mexico; List of years in Mexico; Timeline of Mexican history

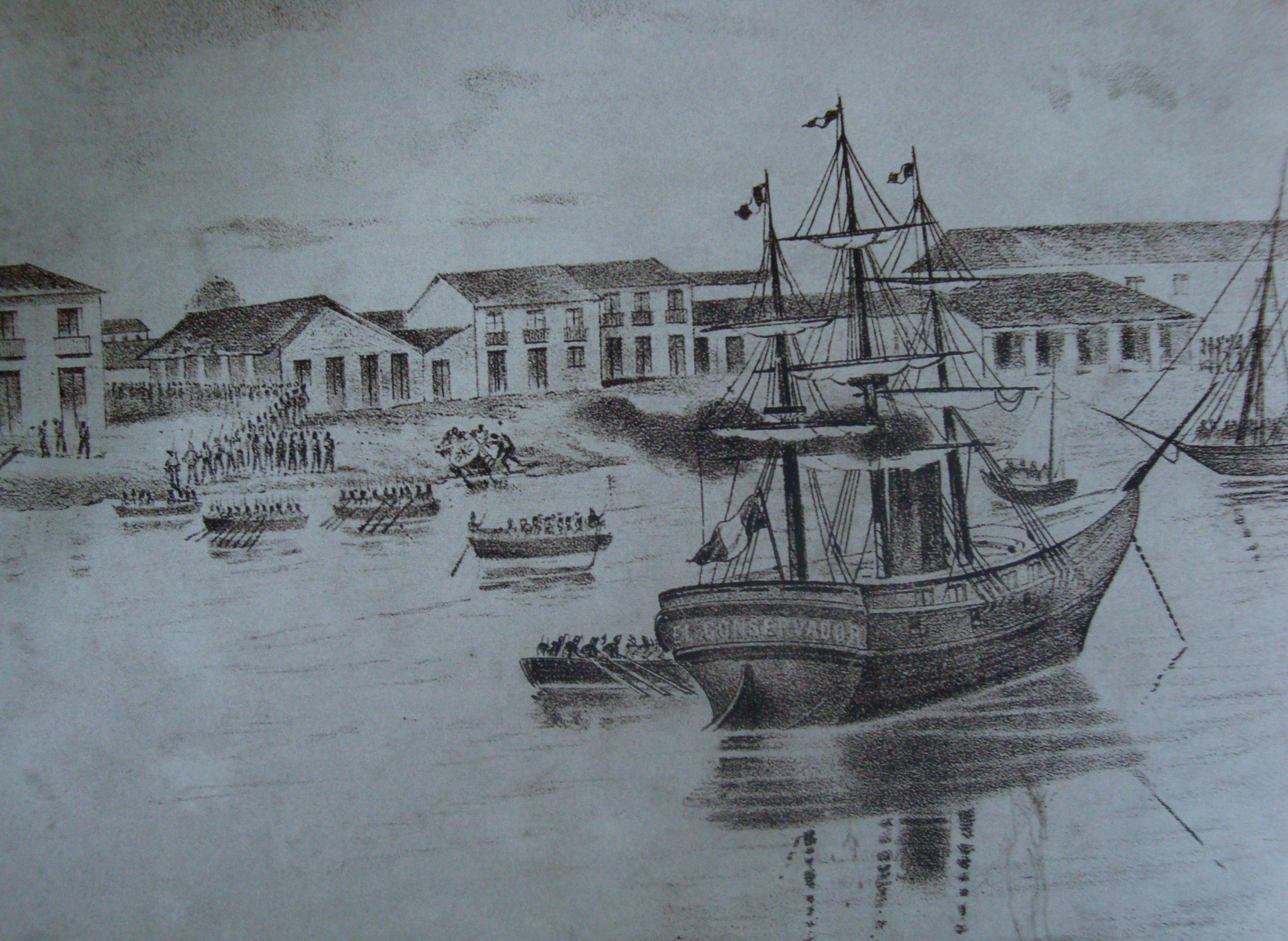
Withdrawal of French interventionist forces from San Juan Bautista, capital of the Mexican state of Tabasco, after being defeated by the Tabasco Liberal Army on February 27, 1864.

Events from the year 1864 in Mexico.

== Incumbents ==
- President: Benito Juárez

=== Governors ===
- Aguascalientes:
- Campeche: Pablo García Montilla
- Chiapas: José Gabriel Esquinca/José Pantaleón Domínguez
- Chihuahua: Luis Terrazas/Jesús José Casavantes/Ángel Trías Álvarez
- Coahuila:
- Colima: Ramón R. De la Vega/Julio Garcia/José Maria Mendoza
- Durango:
- Guanajuato:
- Guerrero:
- Jalisco:
- State of Mexico:
- Michoacán: Carlos Salazar Ruiz
- Nuevo León: Manuel Z. Gómez/Jerónimo Treviño
- Oaxaca:
- Puebla:
- Querétaro: Desiderio de Samaniego/Manuel Gutiérrez de Salceda y Gómez
- San Luis Potosí:
- Sinaloa:
- Sonora:
- Tabasco:
- Tamaulipas: Jesús de la Serna/Manuel Ruíz/Juan Nepomuceno Cortina/Jose Maria Carvajal
- Veracruz:
- Yucatán:
- Zacatecas:

== Events ==
- February 27 – Battle of San Juan Bautista
- March 28,31 – Capture of Mazatlán
- June 3 – 2nd Battle of Acapulco
- October 3 – A destructive earthquake causes severe damage and 20 deaths southwest of Veracruz.
- December 22 – Battle of San Pedro

== Births ==
- January 20 — Carmen Romero Rubio, second wife of President Porfirio Díaz (d. 1944)
