= Valparaíso, Zacatecas =

City in the Mexican state of Zacatecas

- City
- Ciudad de Valparaíso
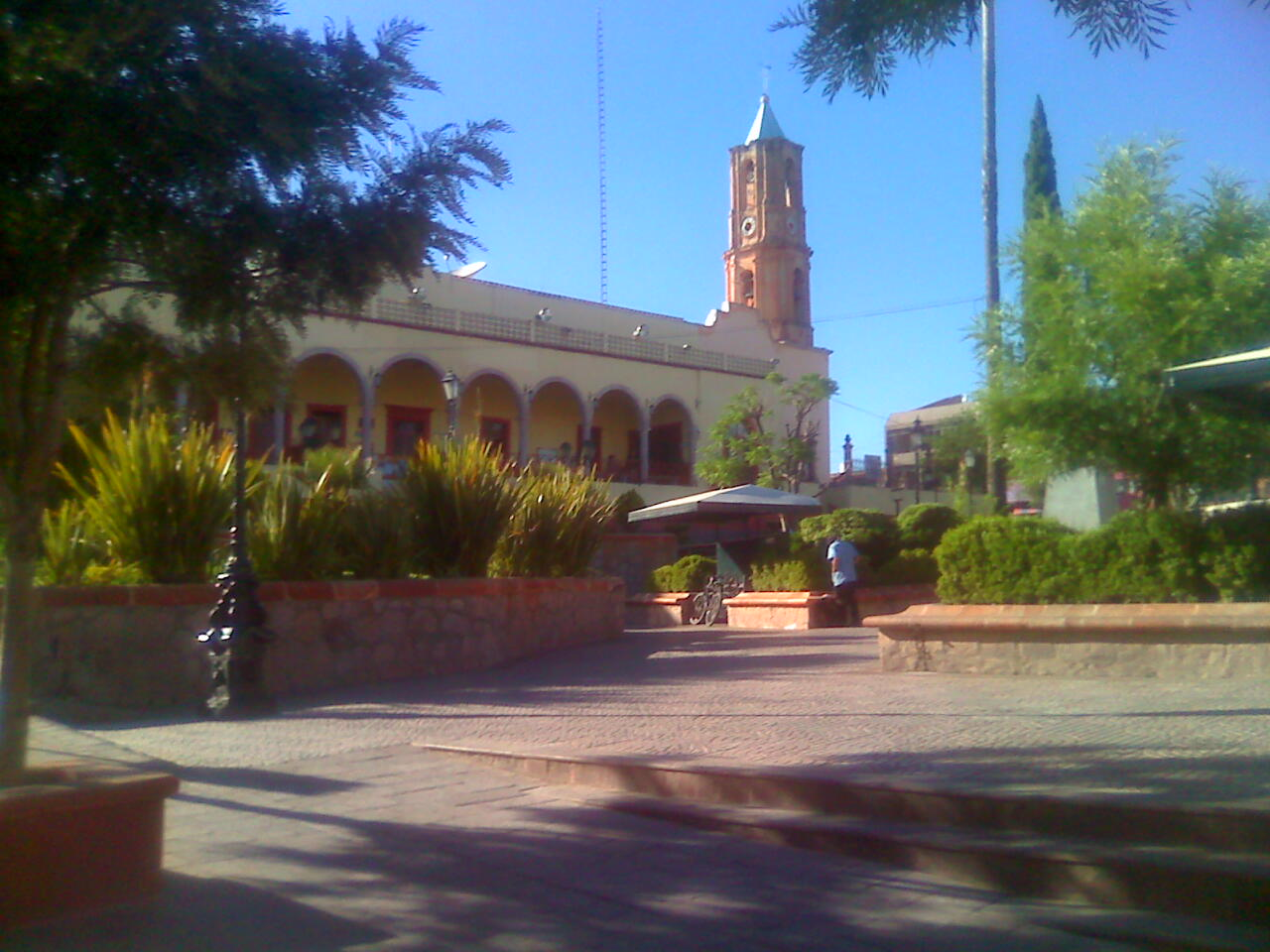
- The town square located in front of the mayor's office

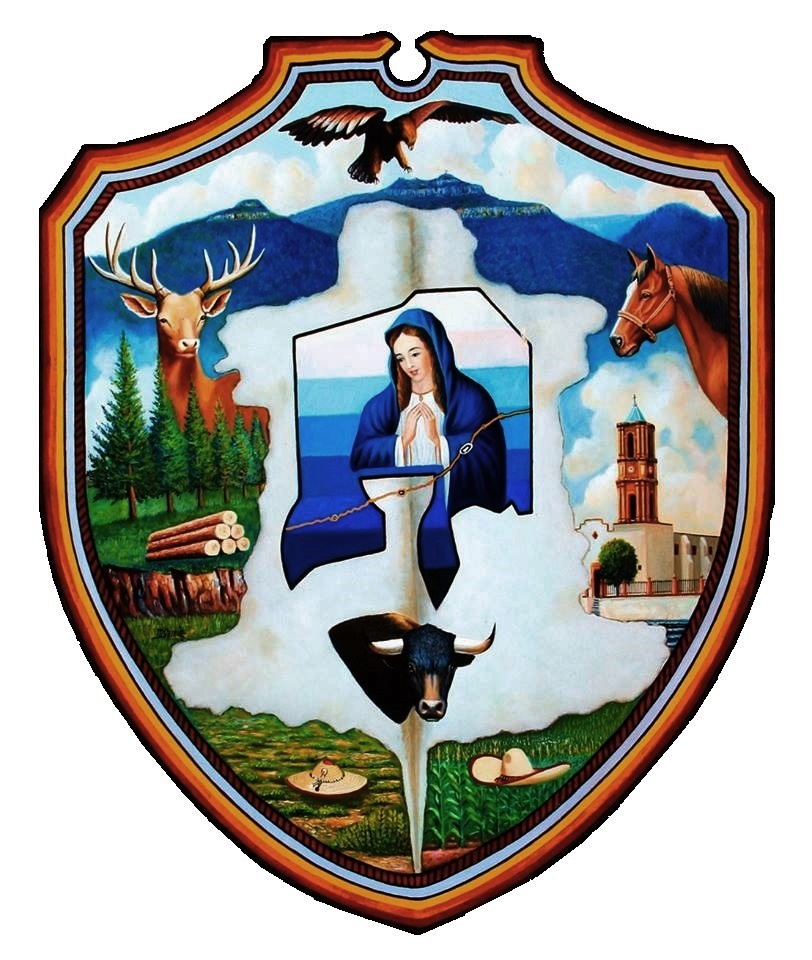
- Coat of arms
- Nickname: Spanish: El valle (English: The valley)
- Location within Zacatecas Location within Mexico
- Coordinates: 22°46′N 103°34′W
- Country: Mexico
- State: Zacatecas
- Foundation: December 8, 1568

Government
  - Mayor: Guadalupe Ortiz
- Elevation: 1,890 m (6,200 ft)

Population (2020)
  - Total: 32,461
  - Demonym: Valparaisense
- Time zone: UTC−6 (CST)
- Postal code: 99200
- Website: Official website

Valparaíso (English: /ˌvɑːlpɑːrɑːˈiːsoʊ/ VAHL-pah-rah-EE-soh; Spanish pronunciation: [balpaɾaˈiso]) is a city in the north central Mexican state of Zacatecas.

== Geography ==
It is located at 22°46′0″N 103°34′0″W on the interior plateau, 70 mi/113 km E of the city of Zacatecas, at an elevation of 6200 ft/1890m.

== History ==
Valparaíso was first a village and then hacienda along with the San Mateo and a few others formed the extensive county of Valparaíso, property of the counts of the same title one of them Don Fernando de la Campa y Cos, was a very rich man also involved in philanthropy building infrastructure for the Catholic Church. Later in 1824, Valparaiso becomes a municipality. On March 13, 1845, Valparaíso was declared a villa and in 1918 it became an independent municipality in accord with the Mexican constitution.

== Economy ==
Valparaíso is an agricultural center for corn, wheat, chickpeas, alfalfa, chiles and beef, pork, sheep, and goat.

== Notable people ==
- Jesús González Ortega (1822-1881), military and politician
- Manuel Felguérez (b. 1928) sculptor and painter

== Twin towns ==
- (United States) Hanover Park (Illinois, USA), 2013
