= 1853 in Mexico =

- Decades: 1830s; 1840s; 1850s; 1860s; 1870s
- See also: History of Mexico; List of years in Mexico; Timeline of Mexican history

Events that happened in the year 1853 in Mexico.

== Incumbents ==
=== President and Cabinet ===
- President: Juan Bautista Ceballos
- President: Manuel María Lombardini
- President: Antonio López de Santa Anna
- Interior Secretary (SEGOB): Manuel Díez de Bonilla/Ignacio Aguilar

=== Governors ===
- Aguascalientes: José Cirilo Gómez Anaya
- Chiapas: Fernando Nicolás Maldonado/Domingo Ruiz Molina/Fernando Nicolás Maldonado
- Chihuahua: Ángel Trías Álvarez/Luis Zuloaga (governor)
- Coahuila: Jerónimo Cardona
- Durango:
- Guanajuato:
- Guerrero:
- Jalisco: José María Yáñez/José Palomar y Rueda/José María Ortega
- State of Mexico:
- Michoacán: José de Ugarte
- Nuevo León: Agapito García Dávila
- Oaxaca:
- Puebla:
- Querétaro: José Antonio Urrutia/Ramón María Loreto Canal de Samaniego/Ramón María Loreto Canal de Samaniego/José María Herrera y Lozada
- San Luis Potosí:
- Sinaloa:
- Sonora:
- Tabasco:
- Tamaulipas: Ramon Prieto/Rafael Chovel/Juan Francisco Villasana/Adrian Woll
- Veracruz:
- Yucatán: Miguel Barbachano
- Zacatecas:

== Events ==
- December 30 – Gadsden Purchase: The United States buys land from Mexico to facilitate railroad building in the Southwest.

== Deaths ==
=== February ===
- February 6 – Anastasio Bustamante, Mexican President (b. 1780)

=== June ===
- Lucas Alamán, Mexican statesman and historian (b. 1792)
