= Battle of Cerro del Borrego =

1862 battle in Mexico

Coordinates: 18.8661°N 97.1328°W

- Part of the Second French intervention in Mexico
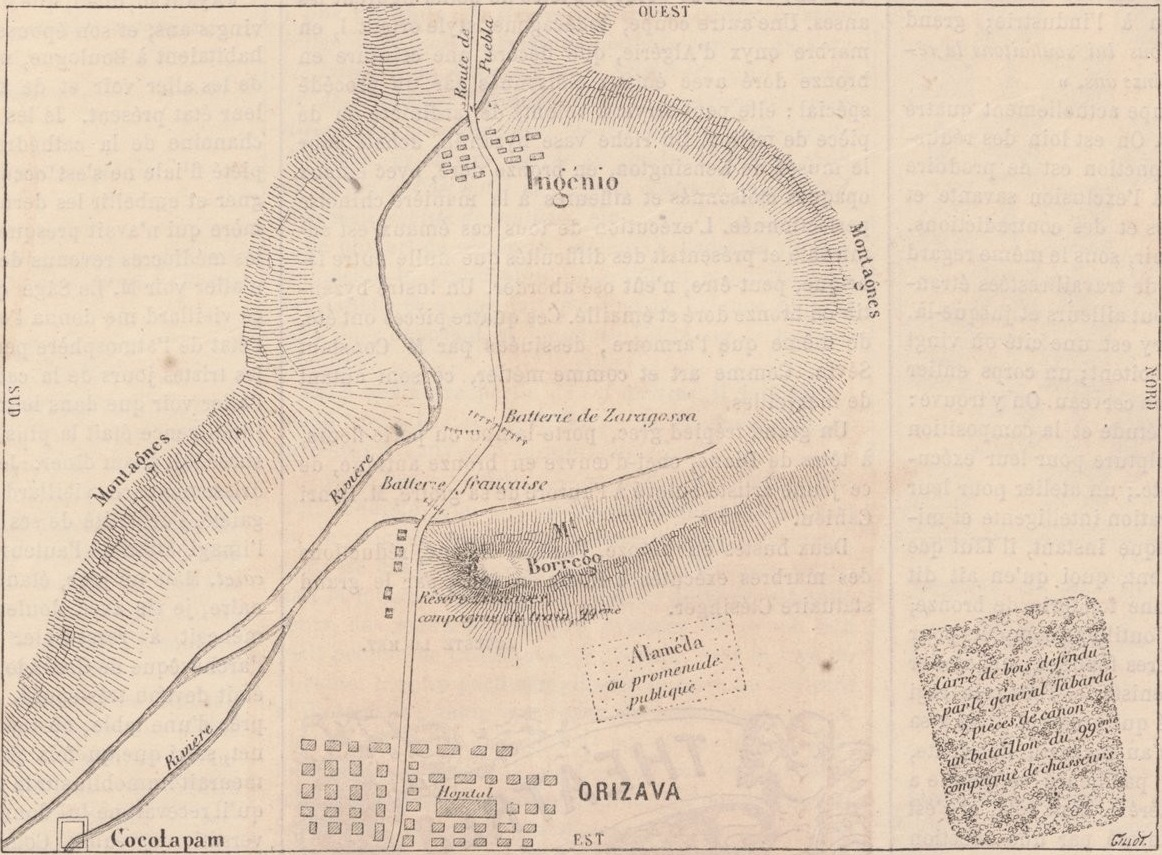
Date	13 June 1862
Location	Orizaba, Veracruz, Mexico
Result	Imperial-French victory

Belligerents
(Mexico) Mexican Republicans	(Mexico) Mexican Empire; French Empire

Commanders and leaders
Jesús Ortega	Unknown

The Battle of Cerro del Borrego took place on 13 June 1862 in the vicinity of the current municipality of Orizaba in the state of Veracruz, Mexico. It was fought between the Mexican republican army under General Jesús González Ortega and troops of the Second Mexican Empire during the Second French intervention in Mexico.

Before Ortega's troops incorporation to General Zaragoza's troops in San Andrés Chalchicomula, he received orders to pass through Perote in order to reach the northern part of Orizaba heading to La Perla and then occupy Cerro del Borrego, near to Orizaba. During the night of June 14, 1862, the Zacatecas division was discovered and moved away from its position by French troops forcing it to retreat.
