= José María Patoni =

Mexican politician and military commander

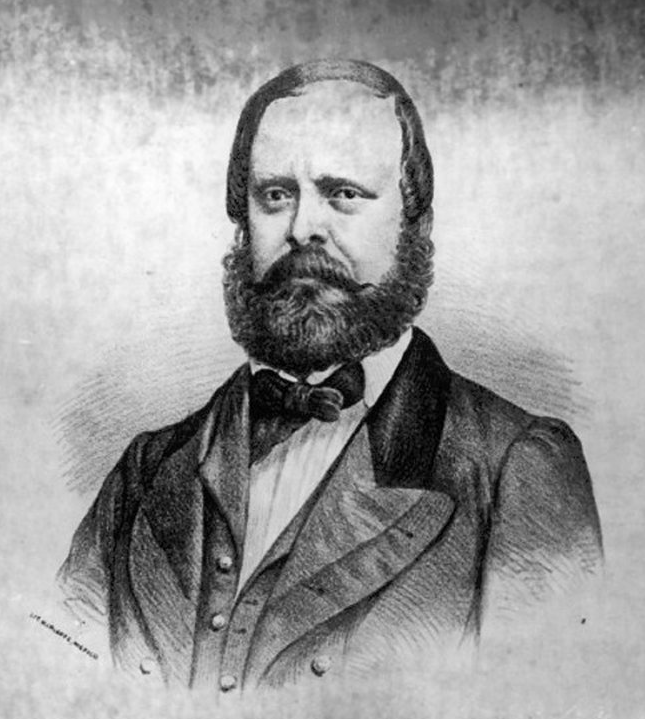

Governor of Durango
- In office 1859–1864

Personal details
- Born: 1828 Santiago Papasquiaro
- Died: 18 August 1868 (aged 39–40)
- Party: Liberal

José María Patoni (1828–1868) was a Mexican liberal military commander and governor of the State of Durango during the Reform War and the Second French intervention in Mexico.

During the French Intervention, a dispute arose over succession to the presidency, and he supported the claims of Jesús González Ortega as opposed to those of acting president Benito Juárez leading to Patoni's arrest. Upon his release in 1868, he was kidnapped and murdered by General Benigno Canto, leading to rumors and an allegation from Canto himself that he was acting upon orders from Minister of War Ignacio Mejía, an accusation which the government vehemently denied. Benigno would be tried and sentenced to ten years imprisonment.

== Early life ==
He was the second son of Mercedes Sánchez and Juán Bautista Patoni, a native of Tyrol, Austria (then part of the Austrian Archduchy). He was born in 1828 in Santiago Papasquiaro, State of Durango. He lived there until 1858 engaged in mining, playing a key role in developing the mining industry, and due to his liberalism he was appointed commander of the state militia, by the government of Durango, then headed by José Patricio de la Bárcena.

== Reform War ==
After the Reform War began, Patoni corresponded with the various liberal leaders, and in 1858 he joined Ramon Coronado with 100 men, armed and equipped at his expense. He attended the siege and capture of Durango with the rank of Lieutenant Colonel, and due to having been severely wounded, while also leading the action in a brilliant manner, he was promoted by Santos Degollado. The liberals secured the state of Durango, and Patoni, after he got well after six months of illness, returned to Guanaceví to his private business.

In the year 1859, the conservative campaign returned to the state, under the so-called "Teulises" movement named after the Zacatecan town of their origin, San Andrés Teúl, commanded by the famous Spanish Domingo Cajén. Patoni rearmed his guerrillas, at his own expense, and dedicated himself to persecuting the Teulises. Shortly after, he was called to the aid of Durango by the governor, Juán José Zaldívar, who, convinced of his lack of aptitude to govern the state in such difficult circumstances, resigned from the position, which fell to Patoni, by agreement of the majority of the Legislature.

His first duty in power was, as expected, organizing and disciplining his army to combat the reactionary troops, which, under Cajen's orders, had managed to take over almost the entire state. In July 1860, with an infantry troop, he joined General Pedro Hinojosa and between the two they beat and defeated Cajén at the Hacienda de la Flor; but the next day, the conservative General Silverio Ramírez arrived with a brand-new division and defeated the Liberal forces.

== Second French Intervention ==
During the Second French intervention in Mexico, General Patoni left the government of Durango in the hands of Don Cayetano Mascareñas and on March 6, 1864, he marched with his troops to Monterrey in order to protect president Benito Juárez' government in exile; however, problems arose and he fell out with the president.

In 1864, while the war was till ongoing, Jesús González Ortega put forth a claim to the presidency, arguing that since Juárez' term expired, and no election could be held at the moment to replace him, the presidency, according to the constitution, must pass to Ortega who was president of the Supreme Court. It was pointed out to him, that the constitutional clause did not come into effect until the following year upon which Ortega left Mexico for the United States. The claim was once again brought up when Juarez' term did expire in 1865, but as González Ortega had not been in the country for a long time, his claim was declared forfeited. In the dispute, for practical reasons, most liberals supported Juárez, though González Ortega's candidacy gained support from General Patoni and Guillermo Prieto.

== Murder ==
Ortega returned to Mexico and arrived in Zacatecas on January 8, 1867, accompanied by General Patoni. He announced himself to Governor Anza and Secretary of State Marquez was sent to Gonzales Ortega to inquire on the purpose of his visit. Gonzales Ortega still upheld his claim to the presidency and asked for a conference with the governor. The conference was granted at which Anza arrested Ortega and Patoni and sent them to Juárez who had them remain in custody until he felt they were no longer a threat.

After his release, General Patoni arrived in Durango on the night of August 17, 1868, accompanied by his wife and fourteen year old nephew and checked in at a hotel. At three in the morning Patoni was awoken by two officials who ordered Patoni to follow them in the name of General Canto, chief of the local brigade belonging to the fourth division of the federal army. They took him to the south of the city where he was shot, and was left lying on the ground. In the morning the police picked up his corpse, and it was buried in the local cemetery on the same day. There was national outrage, and rumors of a government conspiracy, but the government denied any role in the incident, and the perpetrator General Benigno Canto was brought to trial and sentenced on February 2, 1873, to ten years imprisonment.
