= 1863 in Mexico =

- Decades: 1840s; 1850s; 1860s; 1870s; 1880s
- See also: History of Mexico; List of years in Mexico; Timeline of Mexican history

Events in the year 1863 in Mexico.

== Incumbents ==
- President: Benito Juárez

=== Governors ===
- Aguascalientes: José Ma. Chávez Alonso
- Campeche: Pablo García Montilla
- Chiapas: Juan Clímaco Corzo/José Gabriel Esquinca
- Chihuahua: Luis Terrazas
- Coahuila:
- Colima: Ramón R. De la Vega
- Durango:
- Guanajuato:
- Guerrero:
- Jalisco:
- State of Mexico:
- Michoacán:
- Nuevo León: Santiago Vidaurri
- Oaxaca:
- Puebla:
- Querétaro: José María Arteaga
- San Luis Potosí:
- Sinaloa:
- Sonora:
- Tabasco:
- Tamaulipas: Albino López/Manuel Ruíz/Jesús de la Serna
- Veracruz: Ignacio de la Llave y Segura Zevallos
- Yucatán:
- Zacatecas:

== Events ==
- January 10–12 – 1st Battle of Acapulco
- March 16-May 17 – Siege of Puebla (1863)
- April 30 – Battle of Camarón
- May 5 – Battle of San Pablo del Monte

== Births ==
- June 16 – Francisco León de la Barra

== Deaths ==
- April 30 – Jean Danjou, French captain (born 1828 in France)
- November 13 – Ignacio Comonfort, President of Mexico 1855-1857 (b. 1812)
