= Battle of Fortín =

1862 clash of the Second French intervention in Mexico

- Part of the Second French intervention in Mexico
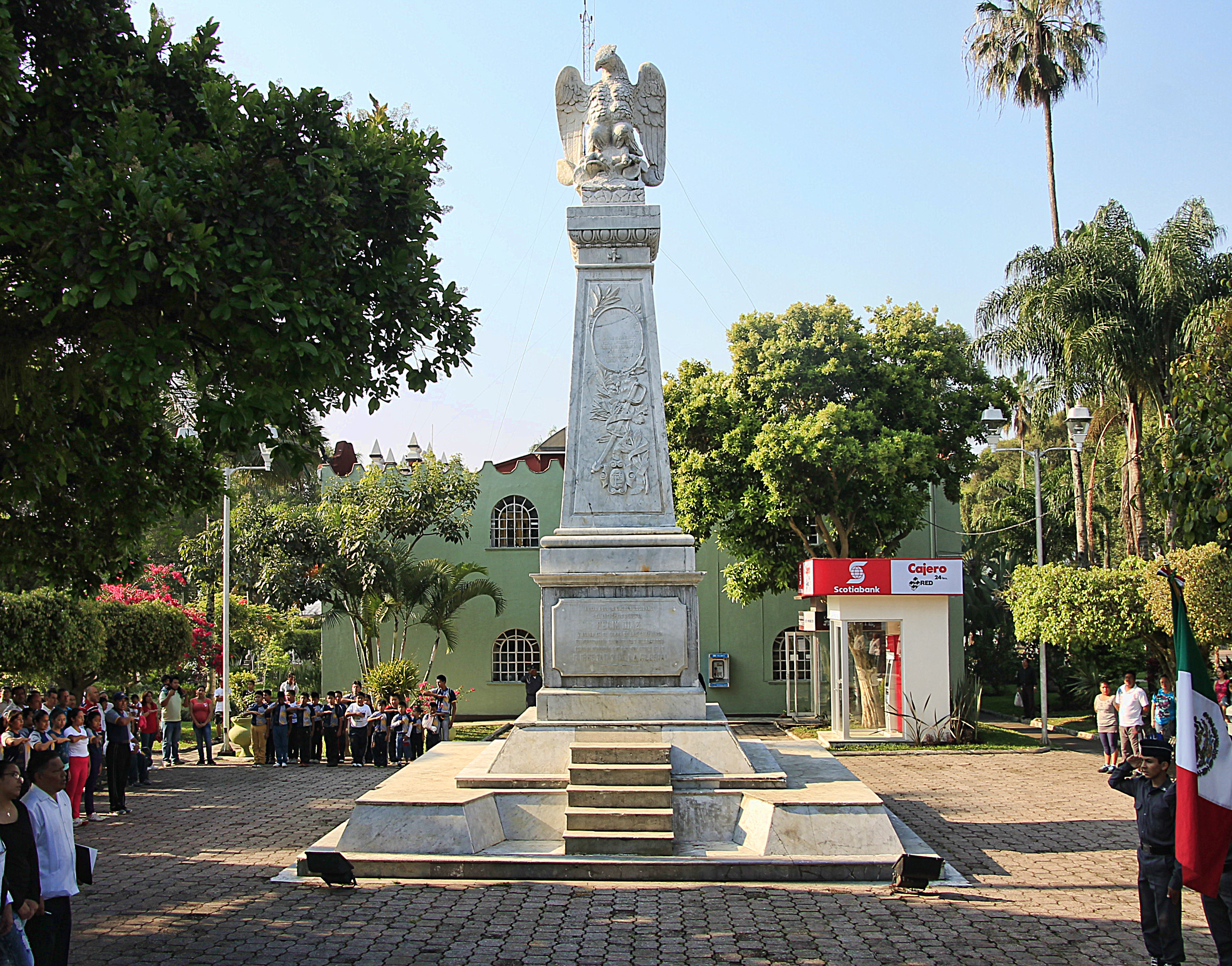
- Monument to the Battle of Fortín
Date	April 19, 1862
Location	Fortín, Veracruz, Mexico 18.8969°N 96.9978°W
Result	French victory

Belligerents
France	Mexico

Commanders and leaders
Prosper Aimé	Felipe Mori

Strength
35	60

Casualties and losses
None	5 killed 12 captured

The Battle of Fortín was a minor clash between French and Mexican forces in the early stages of the Second French intervention in Mexico in 1862, and was the first outbreak of conflict between the two nations during the conflict. Following the breakdown of French negotiations with the Mexican government both sides readied themselves for war. In the meantime, the French left behind 340 of their soldiers that had come down with illness and were recuperating in a French military hospital in Orizaba and marched towards Cordoba. The British and Spanish, unwilling to fight the Mexicans and having already negotiated a peaceful agreement with the Mexican government, began withdrawing on the day of the skirmish. After the suspicious deaths of three French soldiers, General Charles de Lorencez became concerned about the fate of the sick in Orizaba. On the pretext that a letter from Mexican General Ignacio Zaragoza threatened their well-being, he sent his army (about 7,000 men) to help them.

== Background ==
At two o'clock in the afternoon of April 19, the French column left Cordoba and marched towards Orizaba. At five o'clock, near the city of Fortín de las Flores, a Mexican officer appeared before the vanguard and told the French he wished to parley with de Lorencez. The officer in command of the French advance guard suspected that this was a ruse by the Mexicans to reconnoitre the size of the advancing French army and sent the Mexican officer away, rejecting his offer of a parley. The French column then proceeded its advance towards Orizaba.

== Battle ==
After having been sent away, the officer reappeared a little later at the head of a detachment of 60 Mexican lancers who had taken cover behind the terrain and the vegetation. Two platoons of the Chasseurs d'Afrique were sent to confront them. The Mexican lancers, upon seeing the superior force, routed immediately and a twenty-minute chase ensued. They were caught near Fortín and decided to wheel about and face the French, but suffered five killed and twelve captured, with the rest fleeing for their lives.

== Aftermath ==
Upon hearing the news of the engagement, General Ignacio Zaragoza, who was near Orizaba, set off for Puebla in the evening. The next day, Charles de Lorencez entered Orizaba. He made a proclamation there justifying his conduct by the "vile attack" with which Zaragoza would have threatened French patients had he not fled. This excuse was falsified by the French, much like the false testimony that Dubois de Saligny, Minister Plenipotentiary of France, had produced during the negotiations in order to strengthen the cause of the French intervention. After this minor victory, de Lorencez showed an unrealistic level of optimism in the campaign. Exhilarated by the success, he wrote to Napoleon III that he would soon become the "master of Mexico". On April 27, he marched on the Mexican capital. On May 5, he suffered a failure in front of Puebla and had to back withdraw to Orizaba.

== See also ==
- Battle of Puebla
