= 1854 in Mexico =

- Decades: 1830s; 1840s; 1850s; 1860s; 1870s
- See also: History of Mexico; List of years in Mexico; Timeline of Mexican history

Events in the year 1854 in Mexico.

== Incumbents ==
=== President and Cabinet ===
- President: Antonio López de Santa Anna
- Interior Secretary (SEGOB): Ignacio Aguilar

=== Governors ===
- Aguascalientes: José Cirilo Gómez Anaya
- Chiapas: Fernando Nicolás Maldonado
- Chihuahua: Ángel Trías Álvarez
- Coahuila: Jerónimo Cardona
- Durango:
- Guanajuato:
- Guerrero:
- Jalisco: José María Ortega
- State of Mexico:
- Michoacán: Anastasio Torrejón
- Nuevo León: Pedro de Ampudia/Mariano Morret/Jerónimo Cardona
- Oaxaca:
- Puebla:
- Querétaro:
- San Luis Potosí:
- Sinaloa:
- Sonora:
- Tabasco:
- Tamaulipas: Adrian Woll
- Veracruz:
- Yucatán:
- Zacatecas:

== Deaths ==
=== February ===
- February 10: José Joaquín de Herrera, 14th Mexican President (b. 1792)

=== March ===
- March 21: Pedro María de Anaya, 17th Mexican President (b. 1794)

=== April ===
- April 22: Nicolás Bravo, 11th Mexican President (b. 1786)
