= Battle of San Felipe del Obraje =

1861 battle in Mexico

- Part of the Reform War
Date	8 August 1861
Location	San Felipe del Progreso, State of Mexico
Result	Liberal victory

Belligerents
Liberals	Conservatives

Commanders and leaders
Jesús González Ortega	Leonardo Márquez

The Battle of San Felipe del Obraje took place on 8 August 1861 in Loma de Jalpa near the town of San Felipe del Obraje in the State of Mexico, Mexico, between elements of the liberal army, under the command of General Jesús González Ortega and elements of the conservative army during the Reform War. Although technically the war had ended with the victory of the Liberals and the entry of Benito Juárez to the capital, conservatives were trying to form strength to somehow be able to beat the Liberals. The victory corresponded to the liberal side, so that conservatives were dispersed in Xalatlaco.
