= Jesús Fructuoso Contreras =

Mexican sculptor

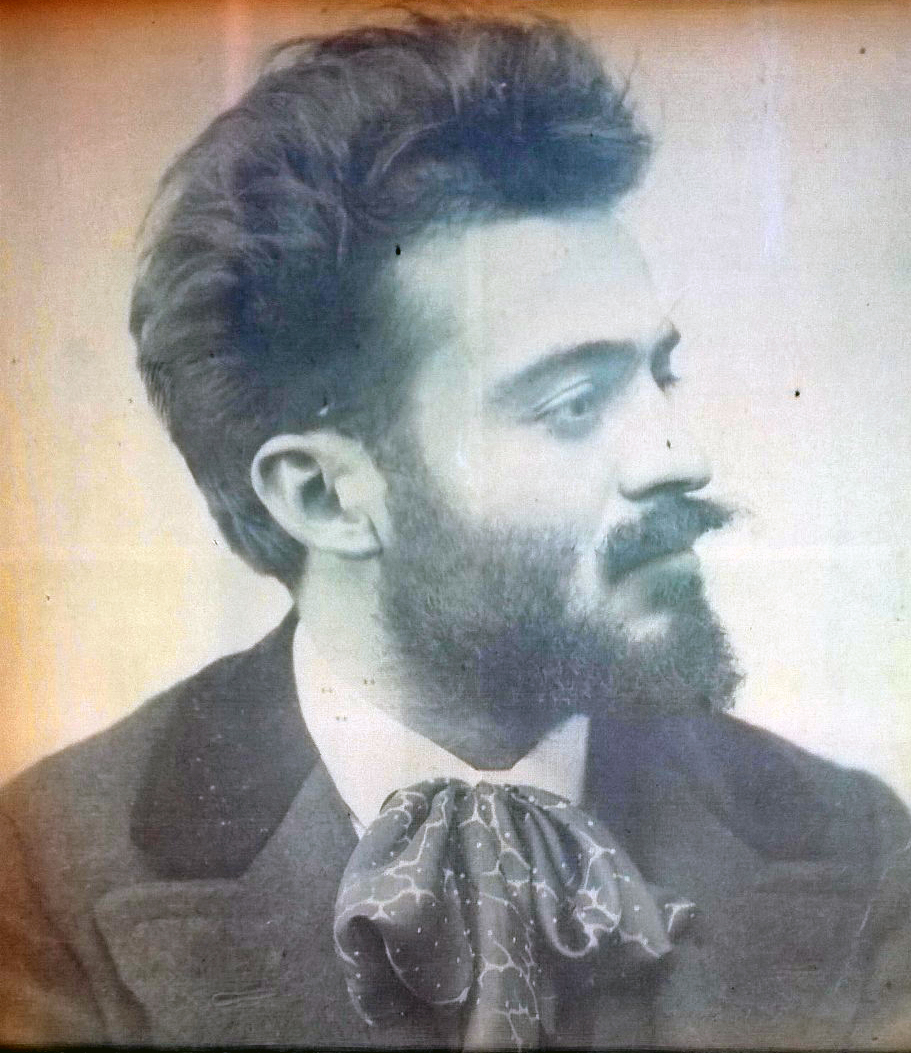
- Photograph of Jesús F. Contreras
- Born: Jesús Fructuoso Contreras; January 20, 1866; Aguascalientes, Aguascalientes, Mexico
- Died: July 13, 1902 (aged 36); Mexico City, Mexico
- Known for: Sculpture

Jesús Fructuoso Contreras Chávez (January 20, 1866 – July 13, 1902) was a Mexican sculptor. He has been called the most "representative sculptor of late 19th century Mexico".

== Biography ==
Jesús Fructuoso Contreras was born in Aguascalientes, Aguascalientes on 20 January 1866. Contreras received his primary education at Placido Jimenez's school, where he studied drawing. Such was his success that at 14 years, his classmates and teachers supported him to continue his studies at the National School of Fine Arts in Mexico City. At the age of 21, he was given a scholarship by the government to study in Paris. He was a nephew of José María Chávez Alonso.

Due to the support he received from the government of Porfirio Diaz, he was able to work on various monuments, including twenty bronze sculptures on the Paseo de la Reforma in Mexico City. With support from the government of Aguascalientes, Contreras founded the Fundición Artística Mexicana, where some of the sculptures on Paseo de la Reforma were created. While in Paris, his right arm was amputated as a result of ill-attended cancer. He died in Mexico City on 13 July 1902, at age 36.

== Legacy ==
A homage by the Government of Guanajuato City was held in January 2016 to celebrate the 150 year anniversary of Contreras' birth. In November 2016, the Patio de Jesús F. Contreras was inaugurated in the Historic Center of Aguascalientes City; a public space that includes several of Contreras' works.

== Gallery ==
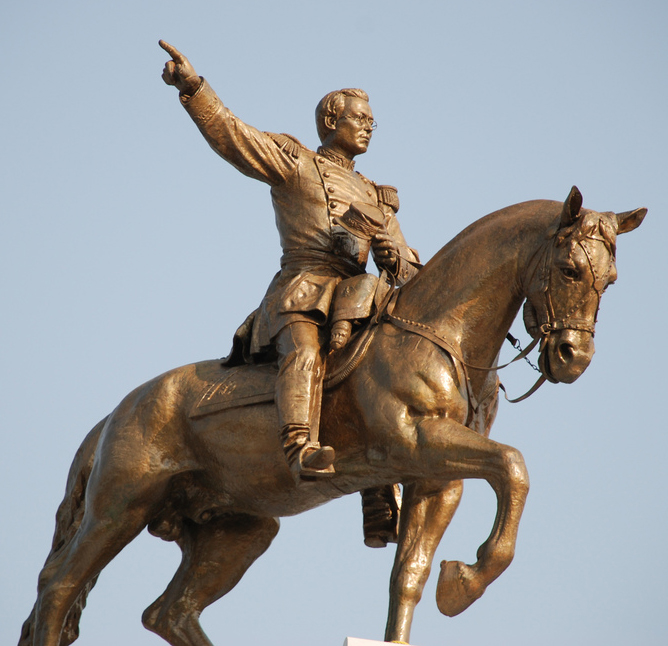
Monument to Ignacio Zaragoza

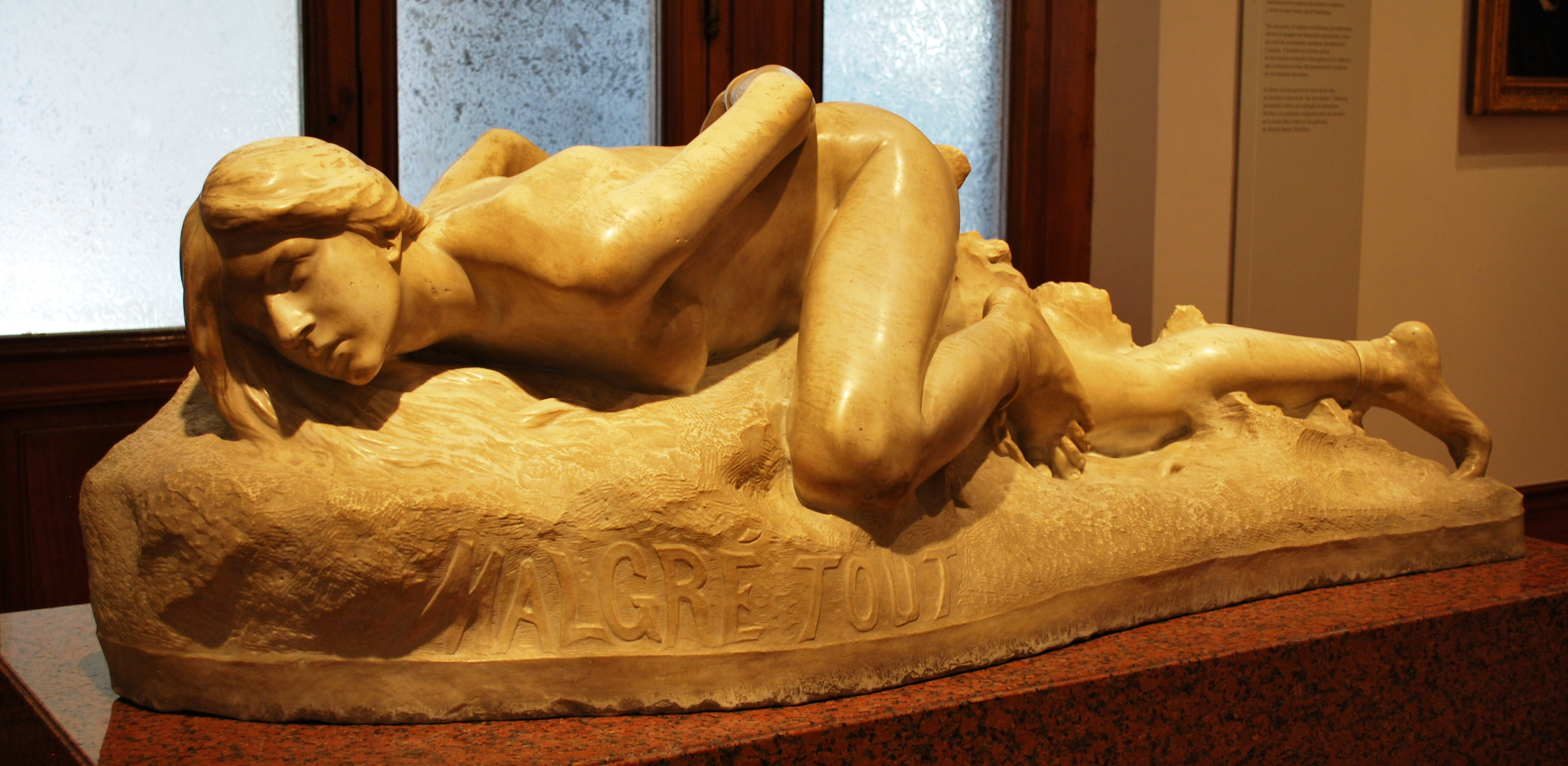
Malgré Tout (Despite Everything) located at the Museo Nacional de Arte in Mexico City

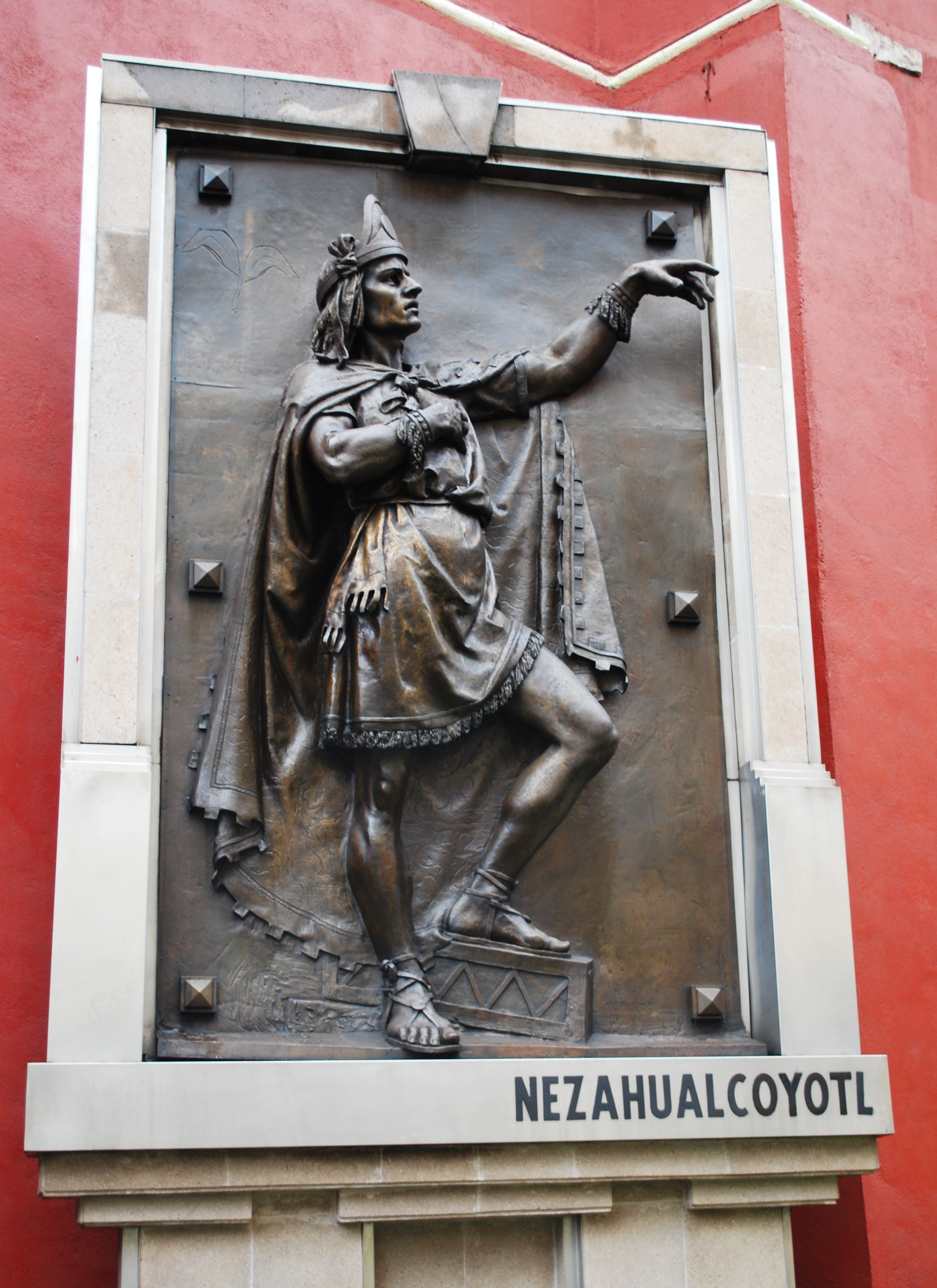
Monument to Nezahualcoyotl

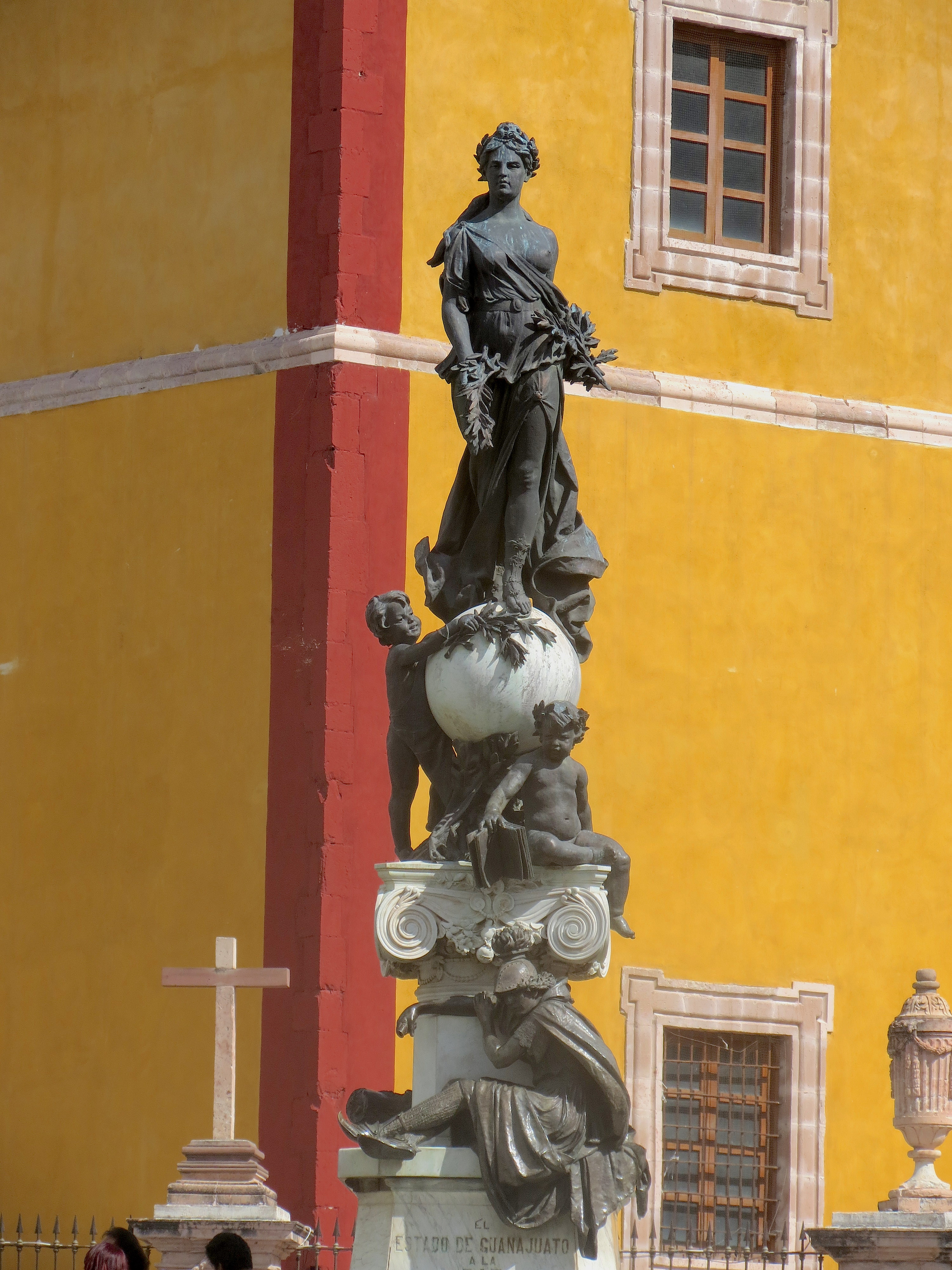
Monument to Peace in Guanajuato, Guanajuato
