= 1860 in Mexico =

- Decades: 1840s; 1850s; 1860s; 1870s; 1880s
- See also: History of Mexico; List of years in Mexico; Timeline of Mexican history

Events in the year 1860 in Mexico. Throughout 1860, Mexico continued a civil war, known as the Mexican Civil War or the Reform War. Two political movements fought for civil control: a reform government led by Benito Juárez and a conservative government led by Miguel Miramón. By 1860, the liberal government under Benito Juárez had emerged victorious in this three-year civil war.

== Incumbents ==
- President:
- Interior Secretary (SEGOB):

=== Governors ===
- Aguascalientes: Esteban Ávila Mier
- Campeche:
- Chiapas: Ángel Albino Corzo
- Chihuahua: Antonio Ochoa/José Eligio Muñoz/Luis Terrazas
- Coahuila: Santiago Vidaurri
- Colima: Jerónimo Calatayud/Urbano Gómez
- Durango:
- Guanajuato:
- Guerrero:
- Jalisco: Pedro Espejo/Pedro Valadez/Severo Castillo/Pedro Ogazón
- State of Mexico:
- Michoacán:
- Nuevo León: Santiago Vidaurri
- Oaxaca:
- Puebla:
- Querétaro: Zeferino Macías
- San Luis Potosí:
- Sinaloa:
- Sonora:
- Tabasco:
- Tamaulipas: Santiago Vidaurr
- Veracruz: Manuel Gutiérrez Zamora
- Yucatán:
- Zacatecas:

== Events ==
- March 6 – Reform War: Battle of Anton Lizardo

== Bibliography ==
- Fernández, Iñigo (2002). History of Mexico: A Journey from Prehistoric Times to the Present Day. Translated by David B. Castledine. Monclem Ediciones. ISBN 970-9019-12-0.
