= 1857 in Mexico =

- Decades: 1830s; 1840s; 1850s; 1860s; 1870s
- See also: History of Mexico; List of years in Mexico; Timeline of Mexican history

Events in the year 1857 in Mexico

== Incumbents ==
=== President and Cabinet ===
- President: Ignacio Comonfort
- Interior Secretary (SEGOB): José María Lafragua/Ignacio de la Llave/Jesús Terán Peredo/ José María Cortés y Esparza

=== Governors ===
- Aguascalientes: Jesús Santiago Vidaurri Peredo
- Chiapas: Ángel Albino Corzo
- Chihuahua: Berardo Revilla/José María Jaurrieta Rincón/Antonio Ochoa
- Coahuila: Santiago Vidaurri
- Colima: Manuel Álvarez/José Washington/José Silverio Núñez
- Durango:
- Guanajuato:
- Guerrero:
- Jalisco: Anastasio Parrodi/Jesús Leandro Camarena/José Silverio Núñez
- State of Mexico:
- Michoacán: Santos Degollado
- Nuevo León: Santiago Vidaurri
- Oaxaca:
- Puebla:
- Querétaro: Silvestre Méndez/Sabino Flores/José María Arteaga/Manuel Montes Navarrete
- San Luis Potosí:
- Sinaloa:
- Sonora:
- Tabasco:
- Tamaulipas: Santiago Vidaurri
- Veracruz: Manuel Gutiérrez Zamora/José de Emparán/Manuel Gutiérrez Zamora
- Yucatán:
- Zacatecas:

== Events ==
- February 5 – ratification of the Federal Constitution of the United Mexican States of 1857
- March 15 - President Comonfort signs the law adopting the metric system
- April 1–8 – Reform War: Crabb Massacre

== Bibliography ==
- Fernández, Iñigo (2002). History of Mexico: A Journey from Prehistoric Times to the Present Day. Translated by David B. Castledine. Monclem Ediciones. ISBN 970-9019-12-0.
