= Lerdista Uprising of 1878 =

Date	July 19-July 29, 1878
Location	Mexico
Result	Federal Victory: Mariano Escobedo is Captured and the Uprising Ends

Belligerents
Federalists	Lerdistas

Commanders and leaders
Porfirio Diaz	Mariano Escobedo (surrendered) (POW); Lorenzo Garza (surrendered) (POW); General Palacios (surrendered) (POW)

Strength
Unknown	Unknown

Casualties and losses
Unknown	Unknown

The Lerdista Uprising of 1878 was a military uprising between the Government of General Porfirio Díaz against the Lerdista Group supporters commanded by General Mariano Escobedo and Lorenzo Garza.

In the first months of 1878, there were some seditious movements in favor of the Lerdista cause and a force led by General Mariano Escobedo appeared on the northern border. From May 18, 1878, he spoke out from his exile in New York and carried out a military uprising that broke out on July 19.

== Background ==
General Díaz organized his forces in Oaxaca, and the government declared a state of siege in many states of the republic, sending General Mariano Escobedo to Tamaulipas and Nuevo León, General José Cevallos Cepeda to Jalisco and reinforcing General Ignacio Alatorre in Puebla and Veracruz, the presidential elections continued their course, since Lerdo, at the instigation of his supporters, had accepted reelection, even after the Plan of Tuxtepec called for non-reelection as its first demand.

After the reform of the Lerdista cabinet, General Díaz advanced with his army towards the East, when the Iglesista Revolution broke out. General Ignacio Alatorre, who was in talks with the Iglesistas, was defeated in the Battle of Tecoac upon the arrival of General Manuel Gonzales's division, which came to the aid of General Díaz, leaving his artillery, ammunition and other war elements in the hands of the Tuxtepecan forces, as well as a large number of prisoners.

When the news of the defeat reached the capital, panic seized the Government, and on November 20, Lerdo left Mexico City heading for Michoacán, accompanied by his ministers Mariano Escobedo, Romero Rubio, Baz and Mejía, leaving the city in the charge of the head of the garrison, General Francisco Loaeza and Protasio Tagle, a Porfirista supporter.

Díaz entered the capital on November 24, 1876, and his army forces arrived on the 26th. As for Lerdo, after passing through southern Michoacán and the State of Guerrero, he embarked from Acapulco for the United States .

== Aftermath ==
The uprising failed, as most of the federal army remained loyal to Porfirio Díaz. This military failure initiated the disintegration of the Lerdista group. Escobedo, who had pronounced out in Guerrero, Coahuila, was apprehended on July 29, 1878, in Cuatrociénegas and Díaz spared his life, The Lerdista General Lorenzo Garza was later defeated in Matamoros by the Federal Army.

General Palacios, who also rebelled against Porfirio Díaz in favor of the Lerdista cause up in Zacatecas for a short time later, had to surrender, so Escobedo, Palacios and Garza were taken prisoner and taken to Mexico City to be imprisoned in the fortress of Santiago Tlatelolco, from where they were released after a few months.
