= Jesús de la Serna =

Spanish journalist

Jesús de la Serna (Santander, 18 June 1926 – Madrid, 5 September 2013) was a Spanish journalist.

== Biography ==
De la Serna was born in the Spanish city of Santander in 1926. His father, Víctor de la Serna, was also a journalist, whilst his grandmother, Concha Espina, was a novelist. He followed in his father footsteps and began to work as a journalist in the 50s. He was the chief editor of both Teresa magazine and Pueblo journal. He was later appointed editor of Informaciones. In 1979, he joined PRISA so as to work as an advisor. Two years later, in 1981, he was appointed deputy director for El País. Besides, he was in charge of several sections of this newspaper until 1989.

That very year, he took over the management of the Fundación Escuela de Periodismo, driven by the Autonomous University of Madrid. He left the post in 1981 to work as the ombudsman for El País once again.

Moreover, he was the vice chairman of the Madrid Press Association, under president Luis Apostua. Between March and October 1982, he took charge of the association on an interim basis, as a replacement for Apostua, whilst the definitive take-over eventually took place in 1992. He would hold the post for seven years, till 1999.

He was married to fellow journalist Pura Ramos.

De la Serna died in 2013, in Madrid, aged 87, after suffering from a long illness.
