= Jesús González Ortega =

Mexican politician (1822–1881)

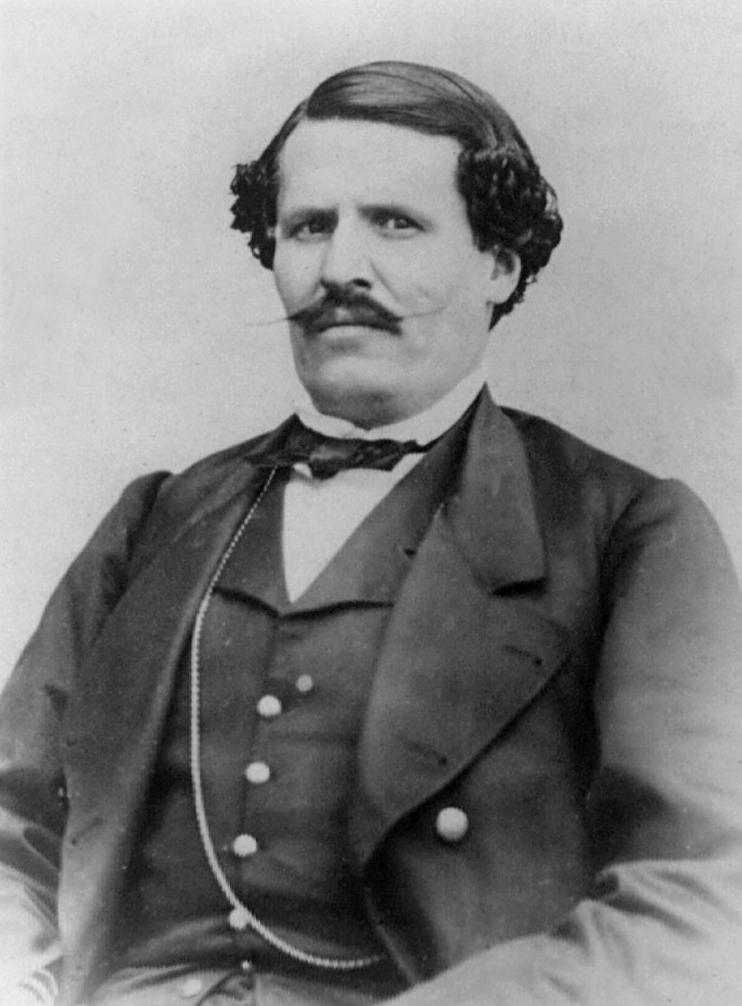

President of the Supreme Court of Mexico
- In office 1864–1865
- Preceded by: José María Cortez y Esparza
- Succeeded by: Manuel Ruiz
- In office 1862–1863
- Preceded by: José María Cortez y Esparza
- Succeeded by: José María Cortez y Esparza

Secretary of War and Navy
- In office January 14 1861 – April 13 1861
- President: Benito Juárez
- Preceded by: Ignacio de la Llave
- Succeeded by: Ignacio Zaragoza

Governor of Zacatecas
- In office July 7 1863 – February 5 1863
- Preceded by: Severo Cosio Paniagua
- Succeeded by: Paulino Raygosa
- In office October 21 1861 – January 25 1862
- Preceded by: Miguel Auza Arrenechea
- Succeeded by: Severo Cosio Paniagua
- In office June 5 1859 – October 21 1859
- Preceded by: Refugio Vázquez
- Succeeded by: Silverio Ramírez
- In office October 5 1958 – April 5 1859
- Preceded by: Francisco Xavier de la Parra
- Succeeded by: Refugio Vázquez

Personal details
- Born: January 20, 1822 Valparaíso, Zacatecas, Mexican Empire
- Died: February 18, 1881 (aged 59) Saltillo, Coahuila, Mexico
- Resting place: Panteón de Dolores
- Party: Liberal Party
- Occupation: Military officer; politician

Military service
- Allegiance: Mexico
- Years of service: 1852–1868
- Rank: General
- Battles/wars: Revolution of Ayutla; Reform War; Battle of Peñuelas; Battle of Silao; Battle of Calpulalpan; Battle of San Felipe del Obraje; Second Franco–Mexican War; Battle of Cerro del Borrego; Siege of Puebla

Jesús González Ortega (Valparaíso, Zacatecas, January 20, 1822 – Saltillo, Coahuila, February 28, 1881) was a Mexican soldier and politician; governor of Zacatecas who was a notable ally of President Benito Juárez during the Reform War and during the French intervention in Mexico. He is notable for defending the city of Puebla from the French army March 16, 1863, to May 16, 1863.

During the French Intervention he had a falling out with Juárez, due to the fact that in 1865, the presidency was constitutionally supposed to pass to González Ortega, but Juárez held on to power due to the extraordinary circumstances, a situation that was accepted by most of the liberal party. He continued to champion his claim to the presidency, leading to his arrest in 1867 and shortly afterward, his supporter José María Patoni was kidnapped and murdered by General Benigno Canto, leading to rumors and an allegation from Canto himself that he was acting upon orders from Minister of War Ignacio Mejía, an accusation which the government vehemently denied. González Ortega gave up his claim, was pardoned the year afterward and no longer played any role in public life. He died in 1881.

== Early life ==
Ortega was born on January 20, 1822, in San Mateo, in Valparaíso, Zacatecas, he moved his residence to the city of Guadalajara, Jalisco, where he began his law studies, and for family reasons could not conclude. While still very young, he came to the town of San Juan Bautista of Teúl (today Teúl Gonzalez Ortega), where he served as a clerk at City Hall. Since his youth he was a fervent supporter of the Liberal Party.

During the controversies over the anti-clerical clauses of the Constitution of 1857, Gonzales Ortega as governor of Zacatecas in 1859, passed severe decrees aimed at any priest agitating against the Constitution, prescribing the death penalty for acts including denying the sacraments to those Catholics that had taken the oath of fealty to the constitution. The death penalty was even applied to laymen who agreed to serve as witnesses for those who wished to prove that they had retracted their oaths to the constitution.

== Military career ==
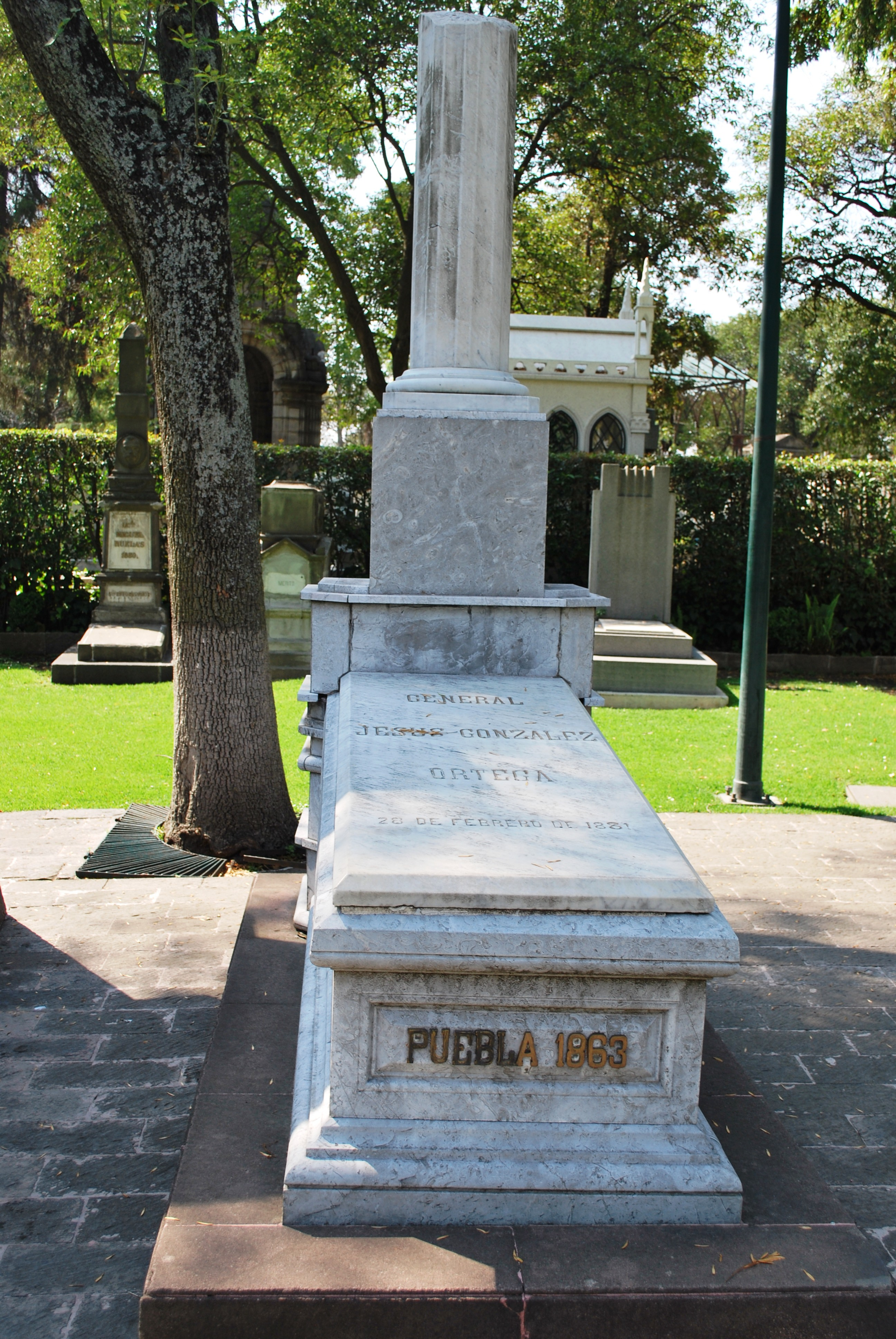
General Jesus Gonzalez Ortega tomb located in the Panteón Civil de Dolores Cemetery in Mexico City.

Although González Ortega was not a career soldier, he was head of the army of President Juarez in 1860 and lead them to victory in the decisive battle of Calpulalpan. In March 1861, he was appointed Minister of War, but due to differences with some cabinet members, he resigned but remained in command of the division of Zacatecas. On August 8, 1861, the Battle of San Felipe del Obraje took place under his command. Following the 1861 murders of Melchor Ocampo, Santos Degollado and Leandro Valle, he returned to Mexico City and was appointed president of the Supreme Court of the Nation, a position that placed the holder as successor to the president of the republic.

== French intervention in Mexico ==
When the French army invaded Mexico, the Eastern Army was in charge of General Ignacio Zaragoza, who defended the city of Puebla on May 5, 1862, González Ortega arrived in the city a day later. On the death of General Zaragoza, Jesús González Ortega was appointed by President Benito Juárez chief of the Eastern Army and laid siege to the remnants of the recently defeated French army at Orizaba. However, at the Battle of Cerro del Borrego, his army was routed and forced to retreat. He was instructed to defend the city of Puebla from the French army, now commanded by General Élie Frédéric Forey again. On March 16, 1863, the French expeditionary army besieged the city, took place a battle that also generated heavy losses for both sides, the battle lasted two months, was on May 16 of that year when the Mexican army had no weapons or ammunition and their strength was sharply reduced by the harsh battle, General Ortega ordered his army to surrender and later disperse giving up the capital in the process.

In 1864, while the war was ongoing, Ortega put forth a claim to the presidency, arguing that since Juárez' term expired, and no election could be held at the moment to replace him, the presidency, according to the constitution, must pass to Ortega who was president of the Supreme Court. It was pointed out to him, that the constitutional clause did not come into effect until the following year upon which Ortega left Mexico for the United States. The claim was once again brought up when Juárez' term did expire in 1865, but as González Ortega had not been in the country for a long time, his claim was declared forfeited. González Ortega defended himself, and published an official letter from December 1864 in which he had been given permission to leave his post indefinitely, as long as he continued to help the war effort. He claimed that he had, and that the government of Juárez had ignored his letter asking for permission to recruit volunteers, and that he was currently entangled in a lawsuit in the United States. He also argued that there had been a previous conspiracy to discredit his military prestige, by having placed him in critical positions without sufficient forces. In the dispute, for practical reasons, most liberals supported Juárez, though González Ortega's candidacy gained support from General José María Patoni and Guillermo Prieto. As the Second Mexican Empire collapsed in 1866, the departing French urged Maximilian to abdicate, and considered forming a new republican government, friendly to France and led by González Ortega. The United States however preferred to continue recognizing Juárez as more agreeable to American influence. In November, González Ortega was arrested by American authorities in Texas, as an opponent to the recognized government of Mexico.

Ortega returned to Mexico and arrived in Zacatecas on January 8, 1867, accompanied by General Patoni. He announced himself to Governor Anza and Secretary of State Marquez was sent to Gonzales Ortega to inquire on the purpose of his visit. Gonzales Ortega still upheld his claim to the presidency and asked for a conference with the governor. The conference was granted at which Anza arrested Ortega and Patoni and sent them to Juarez who had them arrested until he felt they were no longer a threat. General Patoni was murdered on August 18, 1868, by officers of the 1st brigade of the 4th division commanded by General Ramón Corona. There was national outrage, and rumors of a government conspiracy, but the government denied any role in the incident, and the perpetrator General Benigno Canto was brought to trial and sentenced on February 2, 1873, to ten years imprisonment.

== Retirement ==
Ortega would play no crucial role in the war and would be put on the sidelines after the republicans eventually won. In early 1881, he received a letter of recognition from President Manuel González Flores, and shortly after he died at his residence in Saltillo on January 28. His remains were interred in April at the Rotunda of Illustrious Persons.
