= Mariano Escobedo =

Mexican politician (1826–1902)

General Mariano Escobedo
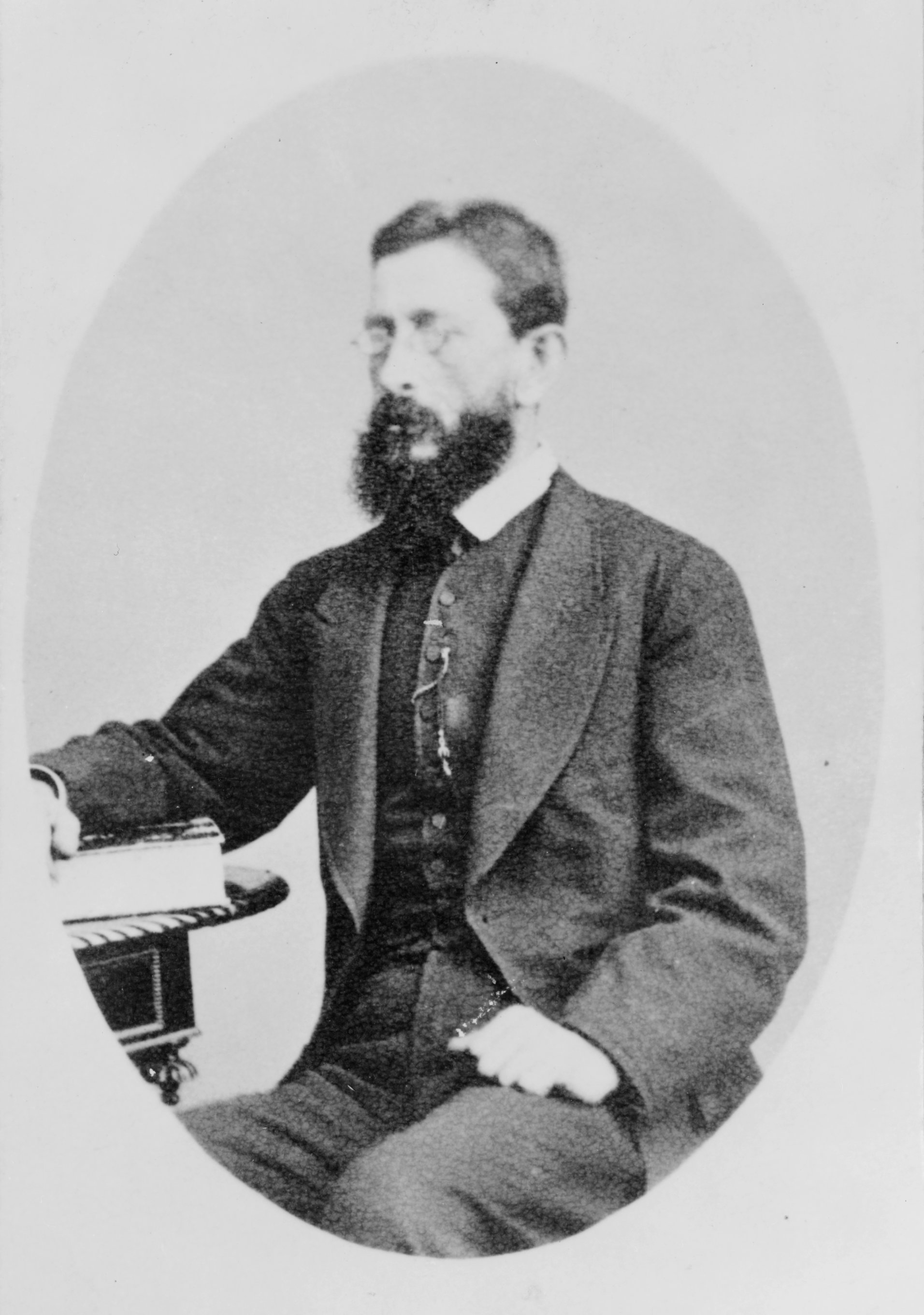
- Escobedo c. 1850–1880

Governor of Nuevo León
- In office 1866–1866
- Preceded by: Simón de la Garza Melo
- Succeeded by: Manuel Gómez
- In office 1865–1865
- Preceded by: Jesús María Benítez y Pinillos
- Succeeded by: Simón de la Garza Melo

Personal details
- Born: Mariano Antonio Guadalupe Escobedo de la Peña; 16 January 1826 San Pablo de los Labradores, Mexico
- Died: 22 May 1902 (aged 76) Tacubaya District, Mexico City, Mexico
- Occupation: Military officer

Military service
- Allegiance: Mexico
- Branch/service: Mexican Army
- Years of service: ?–1878
- Rank: General
- Battles/wars: Plan of Ayutla; Second Franco-Mexican War; Battle of Puebla; Lerdista Uprising of 1878; Battle of Matamoros

Mariano Antonio Guadalupe Escobedo de la Peña (16 January 1826 – 22 May 1902) was a Mexican Army general and Governor of Nuevo León.

== Early life ==
Mariano Escobedo was born in San Pablo de los Labradores (which is today known as Galeana), Nuevo León on 16 January 1826. He was the youngest of six children born to Manuel Escobedo and Rita de la Peña.

== Career ==
Escobedo was a muleteer. In 1854 he defended from the liberal rows the Plan of Ayutla that ended the dictatorship of Antonio López de Santa Anna.

In 1861, Escobedo was made a brigadier general after the government of Juárez was established. He took part in the Battle of Puebla on 5 May 1862, in Puebla, where thanks to his bravery, was promoted to colonel of cavalry. Later, he was promoted to general and organized an Army Corps which fought against the French invading troops, defeating them and capturing emperor Maximilian I in Querétaro (1867).

During the presidency of Benito Juárez (1858–1872) Mariano Escobedo was named commander-in-chief of the northern zone and after the restoration of the Mexican republic, he was governor of several states and military secretary in 1875, in addition to being president of the Supreme Court of Military Justice.

With the arrival of General Porfirio Díaz to the presidency, he was exiled to Texas, from which he organized an uprising against the dictator. Because of that he was taken prisoner in 1878. He was released from prison in 1879 due to poor health. He retired in 1883.

== Personal life ==
Escobedo died in Tacubaya, Mexico City, on 22 May 1902.

== See also ==
- General Mariano Escobedo International Airport
