= Manuel Gutiérrez de Salceda y Gómez =

Mexican politician

Manuel Gutiérrez de Salceda y Gómez (born in Mexico City in 1818 – died in Mexico City on October 20, 1889) was a geographer, statistician and governor of Querétaro, Mexico (1864–1866). He had no deep bond with Querétaro other than that he married Maria Dolores Najera who had spent much part of his childhood in Querétaro. He was a journalist, editor, playwright and poet Imperial, and Ex-Prefect of Querétaro. He died in Mexico on October 20, 1889.

== Biography ==
Manuel Gutiérrez de Salcedo y Gomez was born in Mexico City in 1818 and had no deep bond with Querétaro, except, perhaps, having married Dona Maria Dolores Najera, who had spent much of his childhood in the Estado. He governed it peacefully for nearly two years.

When the rule of Maximilian I grew weaker with the withdrawal of French support, he resigned on September 3, 1866, and left the government in charge of his secretary, Jose Antonio Septién and Villaseñor. Years later, his son Manuel Gutiérrez Nájera became famous as one of the leading modernist poets. Shortly after, 1889 died in Mexico City; his son died six years later in 1895 also in Mexico City.
