= Panteón de San Fernando =

Cemetery in Mexico City

Coordinates: 19°26′20″N 99°08′52″W

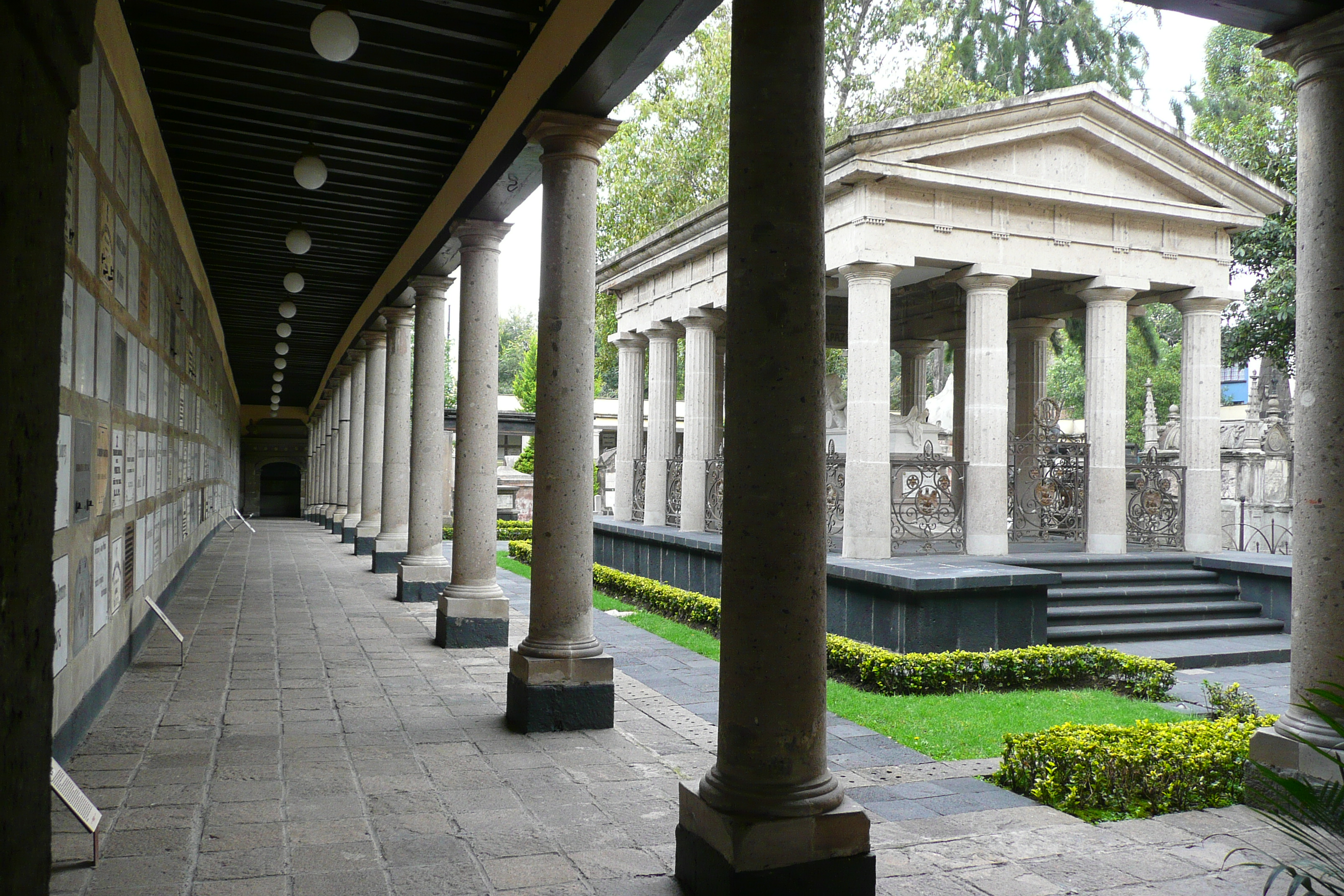
View of one of the aisles with niches of the San Fernando Cemetery and the tomb of President Benito Juárez.

The San Fernando Pantheon (also known as Museo Panteón de San Fernando) is one of the oldest cemeteries in Mexico City that is preserved to this day. It is one of the most representative examples of 19th century funerary architecture and art in Mexico, and it functioned between 1832 and 1872. It is the final destination of the remains of several of the outstanding figures of 19th century Mexican history, and the most prominent are the remains of Presidents Benito Juárez, Miguel Miramón (later interred in the Puebla Cathedral) and General Ignacio Zaragoza, among many others.

== History ==
During the viceregal era in Mexico, people had the custom of being buried inside the temples, as this was believed to be the best way to be resurrected and reach heaven after the Last Judgment. People with greater economic resources, benefactors of the church and people with great lineage and public positions were buried closer to the main altar. The less money the deceased had, the farther his place in the church was gradually moved away from the presbytery. In the Church of San Fernando, next to the main altar, are buried the viceroys Matías de Gálvez y Gallardo (1784) and Bernardo de Gálvez (1786), father and son, who ordered the construction of the Castle of Chapultepec, among other works.

For many years, it was common for the dead to be buried inside the churches, behind the walls or under the floor, barely covered with wooden boards and almost at surface level, which produced very bad odors and very unpleasant spectacles for temple visitors. However, such a deep-rooted custom was very difficult to suppress in society. At the end of the 18th century, the archbishop of Mexico, Don Alonso Núñez de Haro y Peralta, declared the need to stop burying in temples to avoid contagions and diseases, and that from then on, the deceased should be buried in cemeteries located in elevated places, far from the houses and with good ventilation. The first cemetery used in this way was that of Santa Paula, which was opened to the public on the occasion of a smallpox epidemic, located in the area now occupied by the Palace of Fine Arts.

In the Apostolic College of San Fernando, of the Franciscan missionaries of Propaganda Fide, little by little the burial of corpses inside the church was avoided and the space of the atrium in front of the door began to be used. This atrial cemetery was used extensively for more than half a century, and the tombs located there had no names or dates; they were simply anonymous tombstones. At first, the only people entitled to be buried in the cemetery were friars from Fernandino-Desam, benefactors of the church and people of high economic means. The use of the atrial pantheon of San Fernando in those years was still sporadic, so the pantheon had a very reduced extension.

Around 1832, the construction of the current San Fernando Cemetery began, thanks to the efforts of the convent's trustee, Don Ignacio Cortina Chávez, and thanks to the collections that were already being made. As the San Fernando Pantheon was the most expensive in the city, it was quickly able to finance its construction. In 1833, General Antonio López de Santa Anna decreed that all private cemeteries in the city should be opened to the general public, due to the strong cholera epidemic that hit the population. From then on, San Fernando began its services as a public cemetery, although the burial of cholera patients was prohibited here.

Over the next two decades, the fame of the San Fernando Pantheon grew. Because it was a small, clean and orderly cemetery, it was soon chosen by upper-class families as the appropriate burial site. Because of this, the prices of funeral services in San Fernando went up, and in a few years, only the richest and most powerful people of the society could afford to pay for their burial in this place. That is why in San Fernando we can observe the tombs of politicians, military men, governors and personalities of the XIX century society. San Fernando's best period was between 1850, when another cholera epidemic increased burials in the cemetery, and 1870, when there were already other cemeteries in different parts of the city, such as Campo Florido, Los Angeles, La Piedad and San Antonio de las Huertas, all of which have disappeared today.

The San Fernando Pantheon had been owned by the Fernandino friars, who were in charge of burials, masses, high charges and keeping the small pantheon clean and in order. Its fame was great among the society of Mexico City. However, on July 31, 1859, the liberal government of Juárez issued one of his Reform laws: the law of secularization of the cemeteries, by which all the cemeteries of the clergy became property of the government. This law could be applied until 1860, when the Reform War ended and the Juárez government entered the city.

From then on, the city council administered this cemetery, and seeing that great illustrious personages were already buried here, the government declared it the Pantheon of Illustrious Men. Since that year, other great heroes and politicians were buried in San Fernando, such as Melchor Ocampo, Miguel Lerdo de Tejada, Ignacio Comonfort and Ignacio Zaragoza. San Fernando was the first cemetery of illustrious men in Mexico City. With time, San Fernando was practically at half of its capacity, and there were thoughts of expanding it, when a decree of President Juárez ordered the closing of all the cemeteries that were within the limits of the city. This was in order to move them to nearby towns, as happened with the Dolores Civil Cemetery in Chapultepec and Tacubaya. In 1872 the cemetery was reopened for the last recorded burial, it happened in 1872, precisely when President Benito Juárez was buried in this site.

After President Sebastián Lerdo de Tejada ordered the construction of the Rotunda of Illustrious Men in the Civil Pantheon of Dolores, San Fernando was closed and its purpose was only to preserve the remains of the illustrious people already buried there; it remained so during the Porfiriato, until in 1900 its destruction was planned to build a monumental "National Pantheon", behind it, in the current Calle de Héroes, which took its name from this project. It seemed that the National Pantheon would be successfully completed, but the outbreak of the Mexican Revolution and a poor foundation of the central crypt prevented it from being built in its entirety. San Fernando lost some walls because of this work, but survived the chaotic times in the country.

In 1935, the San Fernando Pantheon was declared a historical monument by the National Institute of Anthropology and History, and in 1968 it received a major restoration on the occasion of the Olympic Games held in Mexico. During the seventies and eighties, the pantheon underwent several slight modifications due to the celebration of the centennial anniversaries of Juárez and Francisco Zarco, as well as the 1985 earthquake. By 1997, with the change of political regime in the Federal District, it was placed under the administration of the Government of the Federal District, which on May 31, 2006 transformed it into a site museum, under the tutelage of the Secretariat of Culture of the Federal District. With the earthquakes that occurred in September 2017, the doors of the pantheon had to be closed due to damage to the temple of San Fernando, so it is expected to be remodeled again.
