= Fort Loreto =

Fort in Puebla, Mexico

- Fuerte de Loreto
- Puebla de zaragoza Near Puebla, Puebla in Mexico
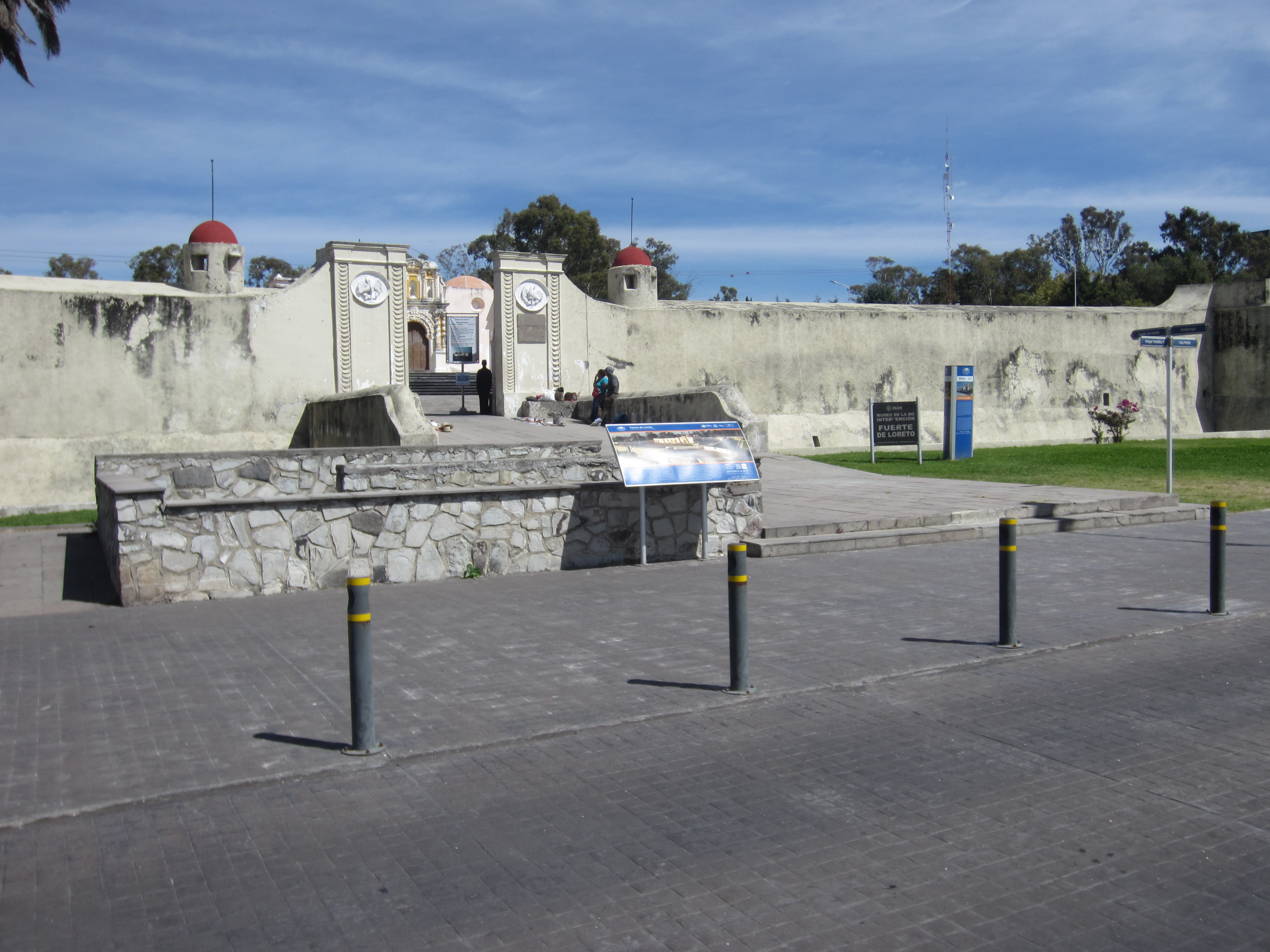
- Entrance to the fort in 2018

Site information
- Type: Fort

Location
- Coordinates: 19°03′28″N 98°11′14″W

Fort Loreto (Spanish: Fuerte de Loreto) is a fort in the city of Puebla, in the Mexican state of Puebla.

== See also ==
- Fort Guadalupe
