= Ignacio Zaragoza =

Mexican Army officer and politician (1829–1862)

Ignacio Zaragoza General de División del Ejercito Mexicano
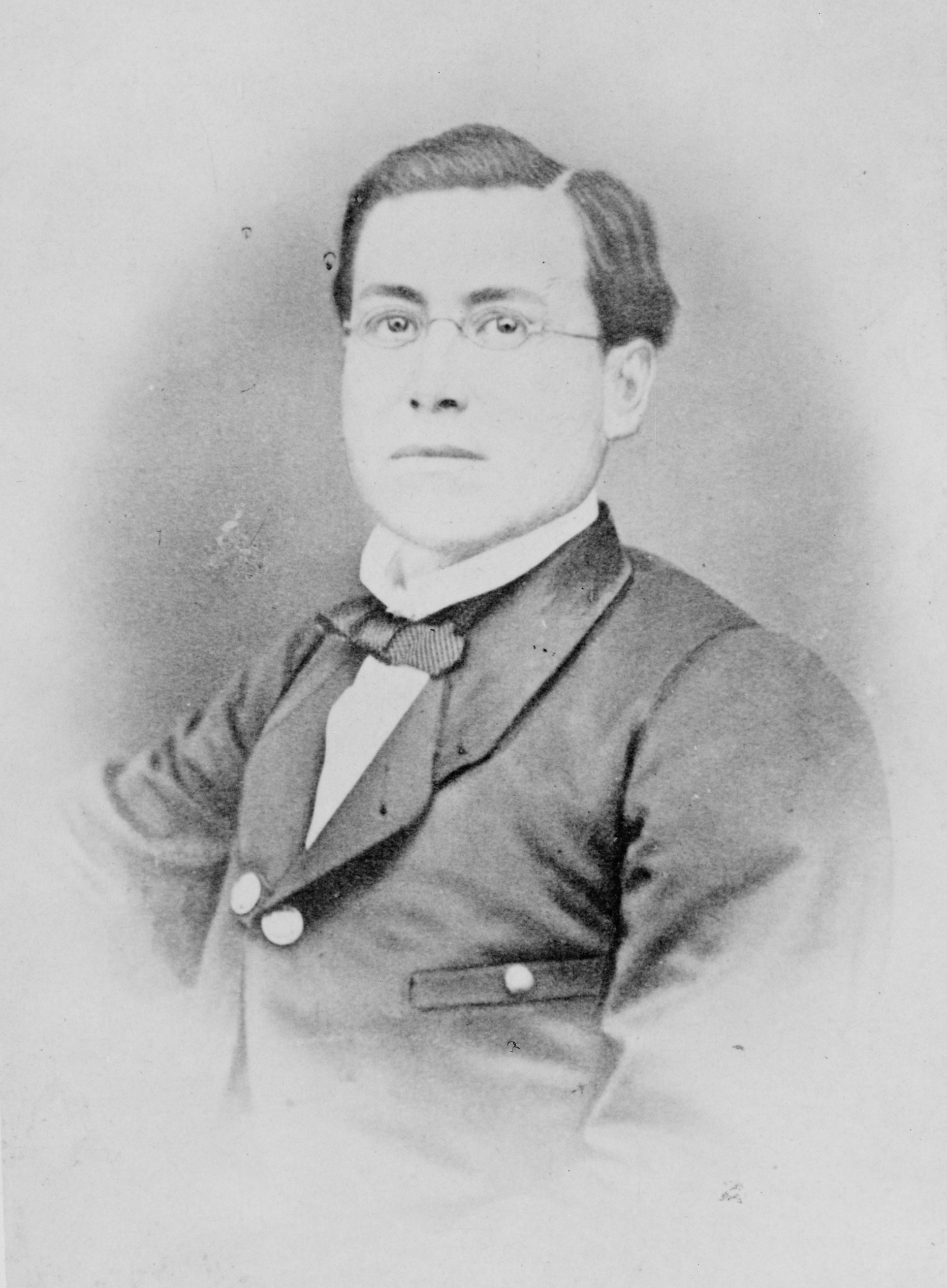
- Zaragoza c. 1850

Secretary of War and Navy
- In office April 13 1861 – December 22 1861
- President: Benito Juárez
- Preceded by: Jesús González Ortega
- Succeeded by: Pedro Hinojosa

Personal details
- Born: March 24, 1829 Presidio La Bahía, Coahuila y Tejas, Mexico (now Goliad, Texas, U.S.)
- Died: September 8, 1862 (aged 33) Puebla, Mexico
- Resting place: Mausoleum of Ignacio Zaragoza
- Party: Liberal Party
- Spouse: Rafaela Padilla de la Garza
- Occupation: Military officer; politician
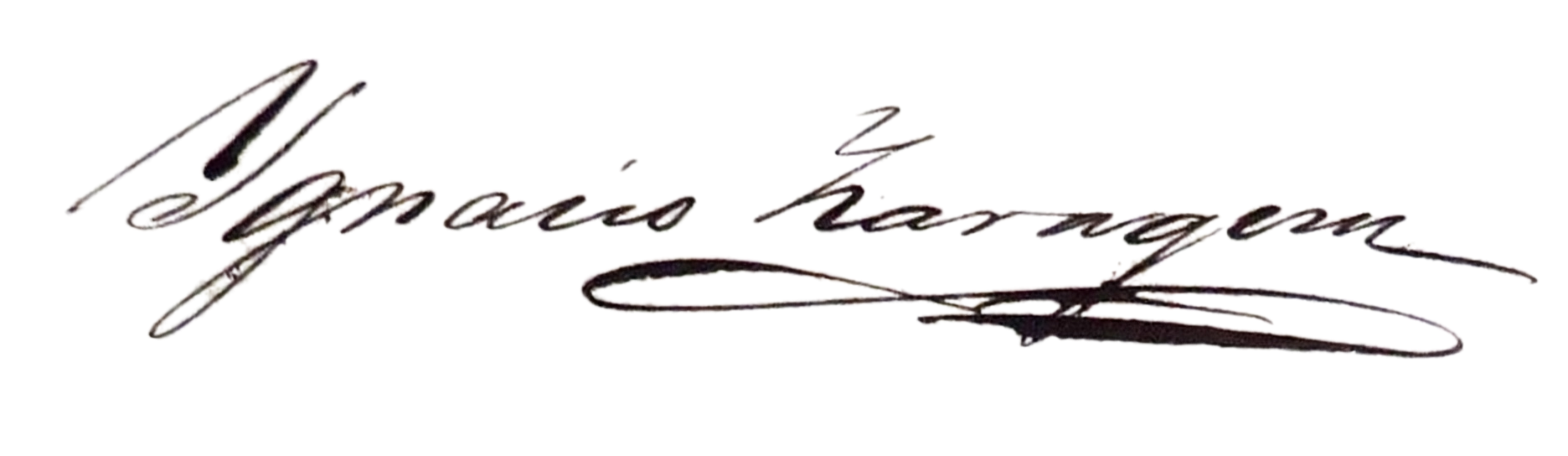
- Signature

Military service
- Allegiance: Mexico
- Branch/service: Mexican Army
- Years of service: 1853–1862
- Rank: General
- Commands: Ejército de Oriente
- Battles/wars: Revolution of Ayutla; Reform War; Battle of Silao; Battle of Calpulalpan; Second Franco–Mexican War; Battle of Las Cumbres; Battle of Puebla

Ignacio Zaragoza Seguín (March 24, 1829 – September 8, 1862) was a Mexican military officer and politician. He is best known for leading a Mexican army of 3,791 men which defeated a 5,730-strong force of French troops at the battle of Puebla on May 5, 1862, during the second French intervention in Mexico. The Mexican victory is celebrated annually as Cinco de Mayo.

== Early life ==
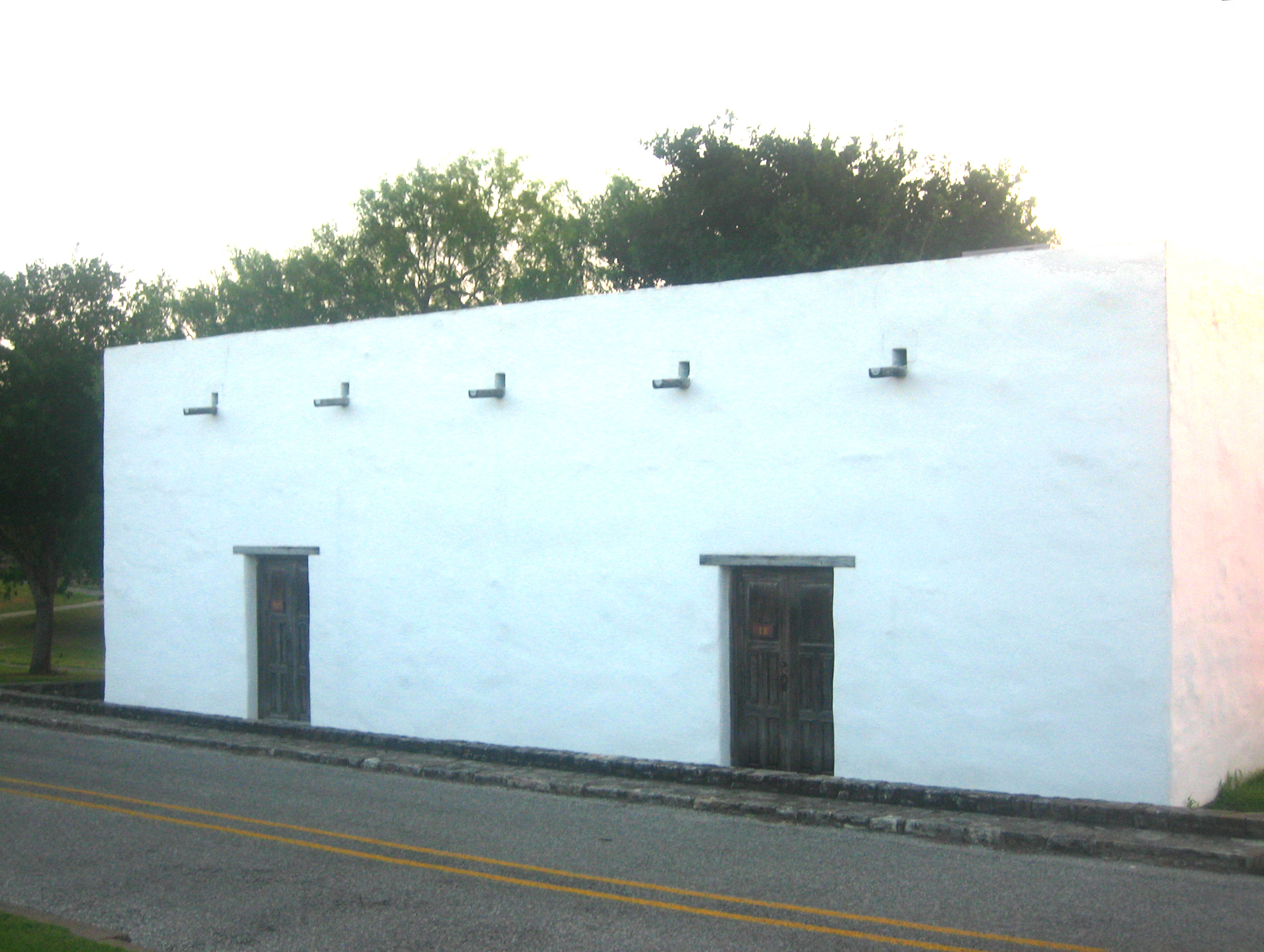
House where General Zaragoza was born in Bahía del Espíritu Santo in what is now Goliad, Texas

Zaragoza was born in the Mexican province of Texas, in the village of Bahía del Espíritu Santo, in the state of Coahuila y Tejas (now Goliad, Texas, in the United States) on March 24, 1829. He was the son of Miguel G. Zaragoza and María de Jesús Seguín, who was a niece of Erasmo Seguín and cousin of Juan Seguín. His father met his mother while on duty and stationed at Bexar in 1825. This was not a particularly wealthy upbringing for Zaragoza. The Zaragoza family moved to Matamoros in 1834 and then to Monterrey in 1844, where young Ignacio entered a seminary. By 1846, Zaragoza grew tired of his seminary life, instead wishing to pursue his military endeavors as a cadet for the Mexican army in the Mexican American War.

== Military career ==
At this point in history, Mexico had already declared war on the United States for admitting Texas as a State, which had earlier achieved her independence from Mexico. Seeing this, Zaragoza volunteered to be a cadet for the Mexican army in this conflict. The Mexican army rejected his offer and as a result of this he was unable to enlist. Despite this rejection, Zaragoza was not deterred. Between the years 1846 and 1850, Zaragoza spent his time working in the mercantile business. In 1852, as a member of the Mexican Liberal Party, Zaragoza got his first government opportunity when he was offered a position in the national guard. Following this, in 1853, Zaragoza was able to join a militia branch of the Mexican army and in doing so obtained the rank of sergeant. Zaragoza joined the army supporting the cause of the Liberal Party, in opposition to dictator Antonio López de Santa Anna.

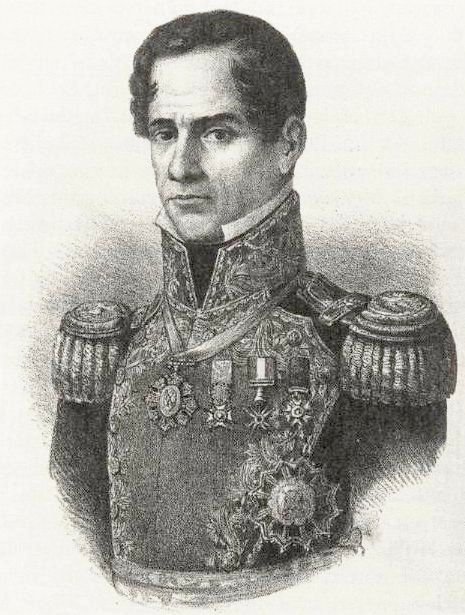
General Antonio López de Santa Anna

Zaragoza's first major experience as a captain in the military was when he led the liberal army against general Santa Anna in 1854. This conflict was known as the liberal Revolution of Ayutla, and it lasted until 1856. Zaragoza and the Mexican liberals were successful in defeating Santa Anna in this revolution. This was the first significant victory of Zaragoza's military career. This victory of Zaragoza's, led to significant political reform in Mexico, and usurping in a new democratic form of rule. The re-establishment of a constitutional democratic government in Mexico fueled the increase in political turmoil that took place from 1856 to 1857. By the beginning of 1857, Zaragoza was fighting in a Mexican civil war against conservative party leaders, Leandro Márquez and Miguel Miramón. Zaragoza was so committed to his cause that he even missed his wedding, in order to stay and lead his army to victory. After this promising string of military victories, Zaragoza won the war on December 22, 1860, by defeating the conservative forces in the battle of Calpulalpan. Soon after this victory, Zaragoza took up a political position after being offered one by Mexican president Benito Juárez.

=== Political career ===
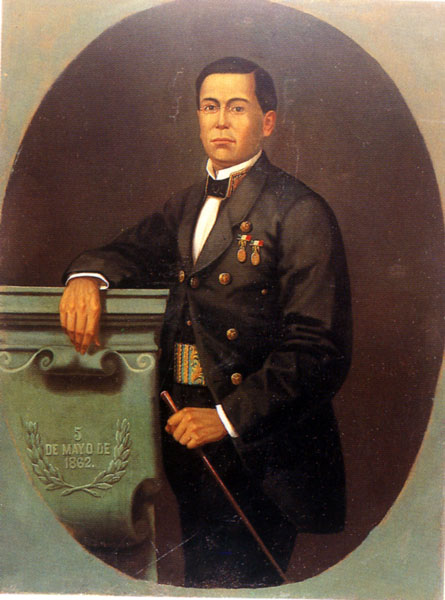
General Zaragoza

In the year 1861, through appointment by then president of Mexico Benito Juárez, Zaragoza served as the minister of war and navy for the liberal party in the Mexican parliament. The role of the minister of war and navy entailed controlling where and how the Mexican military and navy was deployed, and for what reasons and in what capacity. With his success in the military, Zaragoza was recognizably good at this job. During his short time in office, Zaragoza was able to help president Juárez negotiate a two year moratorium on Mexico's debt to France. In 1862, with the abrupt death of his wife and the need for generals in the military to help his country fight France in the Mexican east, Zaragoza decided to resign in order to lead the Army of the East (Ejército de Oriente) against the Europeans, in particular the French, who were using the Mexican external debt as a pretext under the Treaty of London concluded earlier that year to invade Mexico. After this resignation, Zaragoza would never again hold political office.

When the forces of Napoleon III invaded in the French intervention in Mexico, Zaragoza had sole command over Mexican forces for the first time and battled the French at Acultzingo on April 28, 1862, where he was forced to withdraw in the face of superior forces.

=== Defense at Puebla ===
The Battle of Puebla is the most important and influential part of Zaragoza's legacy. This battle was a struggle that took place on May 5, 1862. On this day, in Puebla, Mexico, Napoleon III of France had deployed part of his army to take this part of Mexico as a satellite state of France. In response, Liberal president of Mexico Benito Juárez deployed Zaragoza and his forces. Zaragoza fell back to the favorable defensive forts outside of the city of Puebla, and with his ragtag army, beat back repeated French assaults upon the Mexican positions at Fort Loreto and Fort Guadalupe. He held firm ordering several counter attacks and held the gates to the capital. He then took the initiative and ordered a general counter attack pushing the French in a general retreat to Orizaba with Zaragoza's men in pursuit. After all was said and done, Zaragoza and his forces won the day-long battle, losing approximately ninety men compared to the estimated 1,000 French casualties. After this victory, Zaragoza was quickly elevated to the status of Mexican war hero. This victory led to the establishment of the renowned holiday Cinco De Mayo.

== Death ==
Shortly after his famous victory, Zaragoza was struck with typhoid fever, of which he died at the age of 33. His army would never have a commander equal to him as they suffered defeats later on. He was buried in San Fernando Cemetery in Mexico City. He was later exhumed and transferred to Puebla, while his former tomb became a monument. When the French left Mexico in defeat, Zaragoza became a legend as one of the few Mexican generals to have success in battle against the then-greatest army in the world.

== Personal life ==
In 1857 he married Rafaela Padilla de la Garza. They married in Monterrey with his brother acting as proxy because Zaragoza was away on military duty. The couple had four children, three of whom died in infancy. Rafaela herself died on January 13, 1862 mere months before Zaragoza's triumph at Puebla. Since 1979 their remains have being together at a mausoleum in Puebla

== Legacy ==
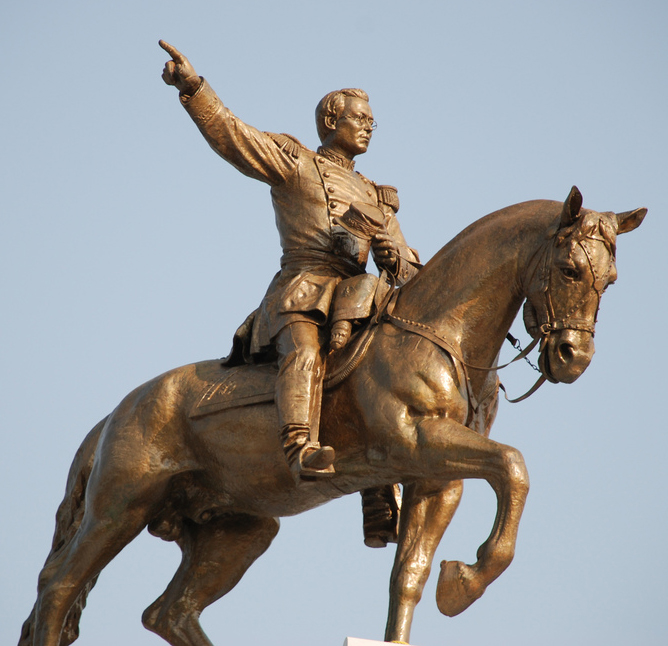
Equestrian statue of Ignacio Zaragoza by Jesús Fructuoso Contreras centerpiece of Zaragoza's mausoleum

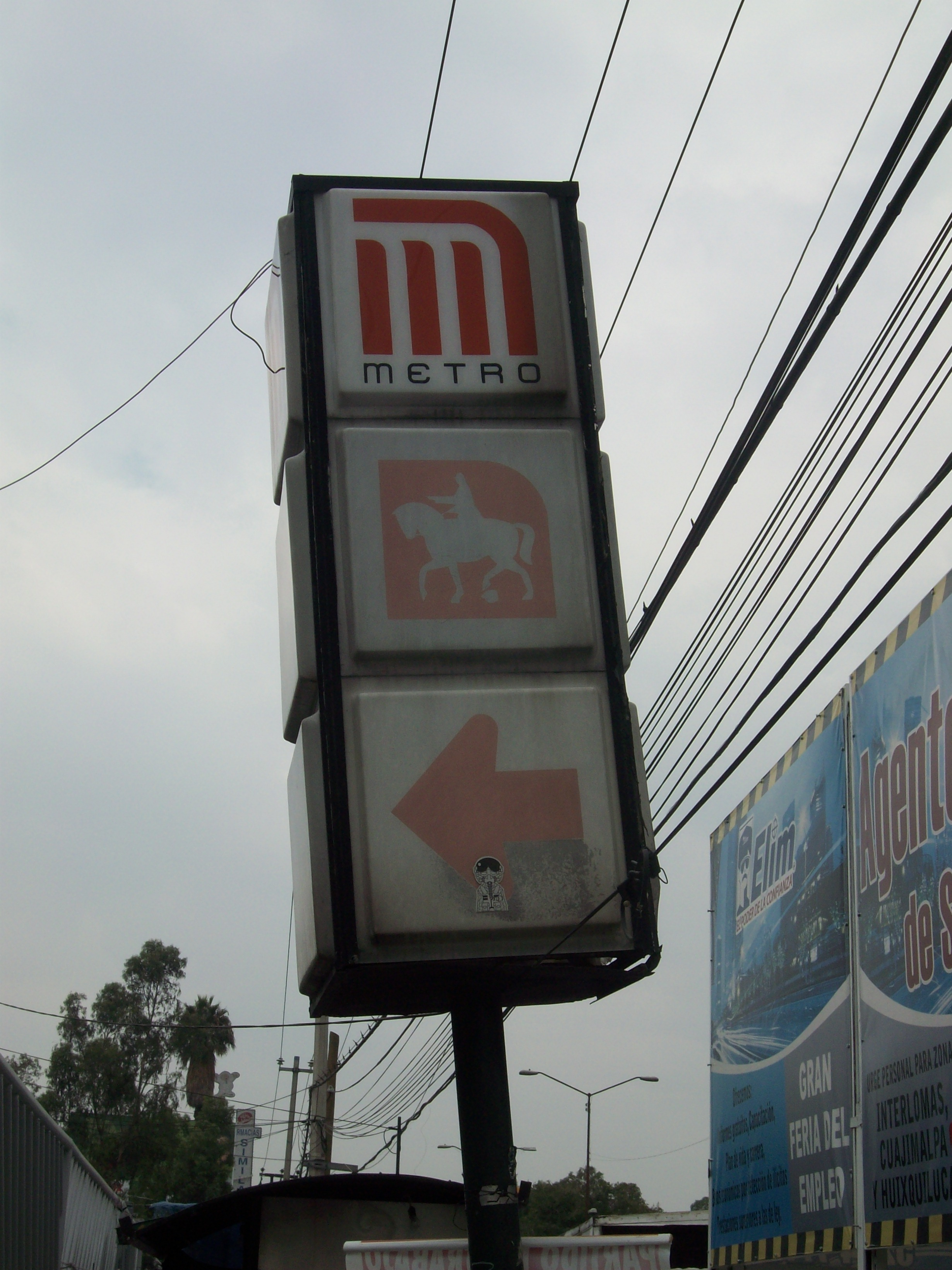
Zaragoza, a station on the Mexico City Metro

On September 11, 1862, soon after Zaragoza's death, President Benito Juárez issue a decree officially renamed the city of Puebla to Puebla de Zaragoza. Also by decree, the state Coahila was renamed Coahuila de Zaragoza in 1864. The change was later ratified by the Congress of the Union in 1868.

His famous quotation, Las armas nacionales se han cubierto de gloria ("The national arms have been covered with glory"), is used to remember the battle, and comes from the single-line letter he wrote to his superior, President Juárez, informing him of the victory. The quotation was included, along with Zaragoza's likeness, on Mexican 500-peso banknotes from 1995 to 2010 (Series D).

There is a municipality in the Mexican state of Chihuahua that is named after Zaragoza.

There are urban localities named after Zaragoza in the Mexican states of Chiapas, Chihuahua, Puebla, and Tlaxcala.

Most Mexican states have at least one rural locality named after Zaragoza; there are at least 52 rural localities named after Zaragoza as of 2021.

Calzada Ignacio Zaragoza is one of the main avenues of Mexico City, crossing the city from center to the southeast, and at its intersection with Avenida Río Churubusco it becomes Mexican Federal Highway 150D. There is also a subway station on Line 1 of the Mexico City Metro named after Zaragoza, depicting a white silhouette of him as the horse rider against a pink background.

In the film Cinco de Mayo La Batalla (2013), Zaragoza was portrayed by Kuno Becker.

== See also ==
- Zaragoza Birthplace State Historic Site
- Monument to Ignacio Zaragoza

== Sources ==
- Texas General Land Office, "The Texas Hero of Cinco De Mayo: Ignacio Zaragoza, and the Origins of the Celebration." Medium, Medium, April 29, 2020
- Strong, W.F. "The Hero of Cinco De Mayo". Texas Co-op Power Magazine, May 2021.
- Herz, May, et al. "General Ignacio Zaragoza: Cinco de Mayo Hero". Inside Mexico, January 1, 1962.
