= Manuel Z. Gómez =

Mexican politician

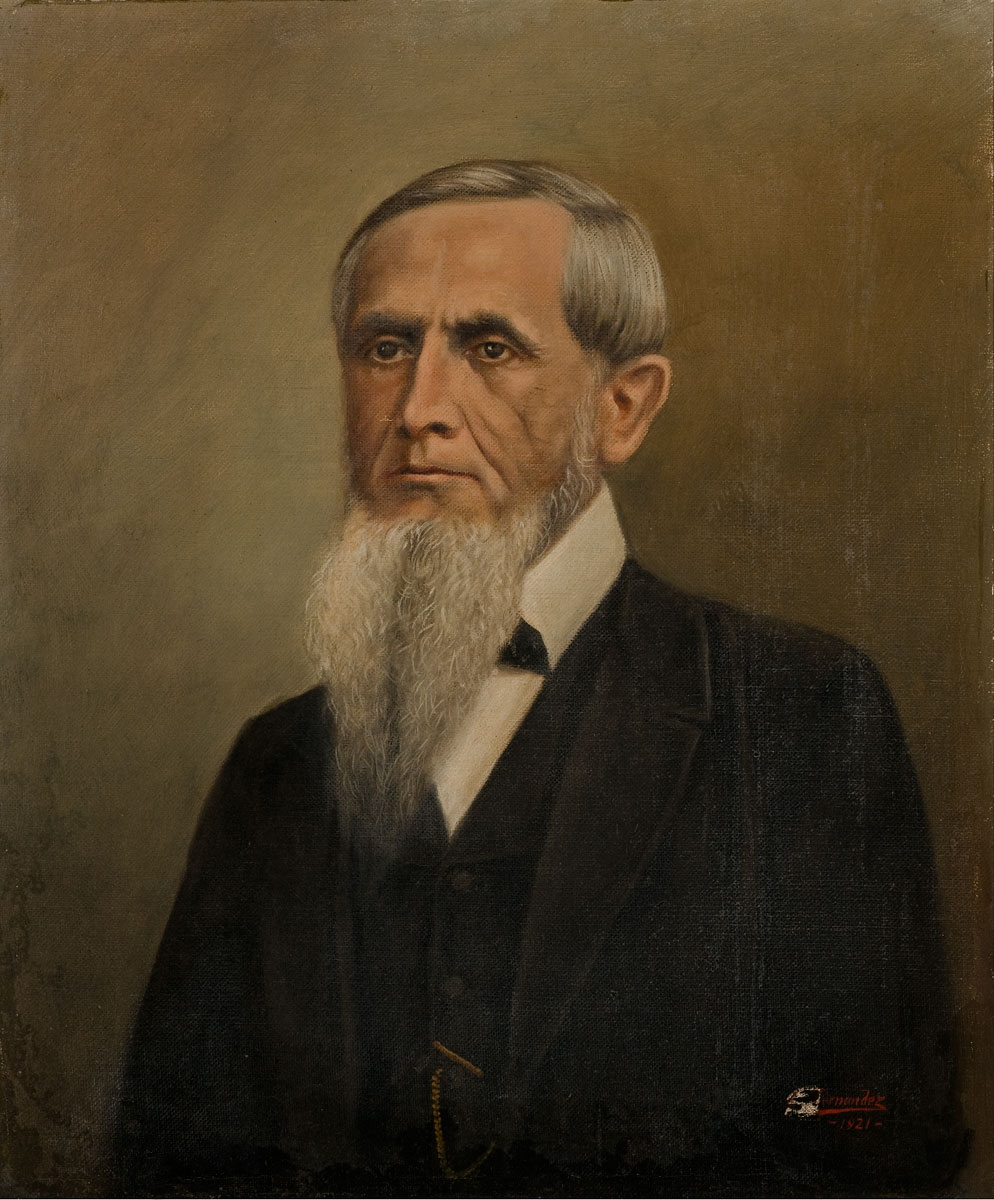
- Posthumous portrait by Eligio Fernández (1921)

Governor of Nuevo León (interim)
- In office 1866 – 4 December 1867
- Preceded by: Mariano Escobedo
- Succeeded by: Jerónimo Treviño

Personal details
- Born: José Manuel Zacarías Gómez Valdés; 4 November 1813 San Felipe de Linares, Nuevo León
- Died: 27 July 1871 (aged 57) Monterrey, Nuevo León
- Education: San Idelfonso College

José Manuel Zacarías Gómez Valdés (4 November 1813 – 27 July 1871) was a 19th-century Mexican lawyer and politician who served as interim governor of Nuevo León (1866–1867), senator, and congressman in the Chamber of Deputies representing the states of Nuevo León and Tamaulipas.

As congressman, he celebrated the annexation of Coahuila by Nuevo León and during his administration, he was satirized by El cura de Tamajón, an ephemeral weekly publication edited by Jesús Flores and written mostly by Guillermo Prieto during his stay in Monterrey.

Aside from his political activities, Gómez also presided over Nuevo León's Supreme Tribunal of Justice in 1867.

== Works ==
- La vida del General Ignacio Zaragoza

== See also ==
- Governor of Nuevo León
