= Fort Guadalupe =

Fort in Puebla, Mexico

- Fuerte de Guadalupe
- Puebla, Puebla in Mexico
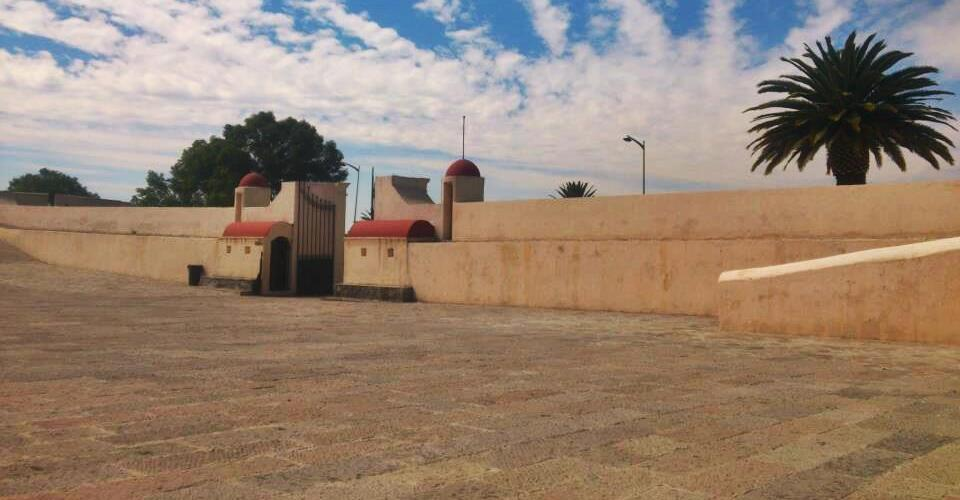
- One of the fort's walls in 2013

Site information
- Type: Fort

Location
- Coordinates: 19°3′9″N 98°10′48″W

Fort Guadalupe (Spanish: Fuerte de Guadalupe) is a fort in the city of Puebla, in the Mexican state of Puebla.

== See also ==
- Fort Loreto
