= Garita (checkpoint) =

Federal inspection stations of the Mexican government

Garitas or retenes (singular: retén) are federal inspection stations operated by the Mexican government. They are officially known as "garitas de revisión" (checkpoints). They are usually located within 50 kilometres (31 mi) of the national border with the United States, Belize, and Guatemala. They function as immigration checkpoints, where documents and cargo are to be inspected.

The United States Border Patrol operates a similar series of checkpoints. These are also referred to as garitas by the Latin American community.

== List of garitas in Mexico ==
Garitas along the Mexico–U.S. Border (listed in order from west to east)

- Garita Pichilingue – located 17 kilometres (11 mi) south of La Paz, Baja California Sur, on Federal Highway 11
- Garita Santa Rosalía – located along Federal Highway 1 in Baja California Sur
- Garita Cabullona – located 28.5 kilometres (17.7 mi) south of Agua Prieta, Sonora, on Federal Highway 17 – 31°5′15.45″N 109°35′11.31″W
- Garita San Antonio – located 117.5 kilometres (73.0 mi) south of Naco, Sonora, on Federal Highway 2 – 30°58′33.17″N 110°34′45.20″W
- Garita Mututicachi – located 163.5 kilometres (101.6 mi) south of Arizpe, Sonora, on Federal Highway 89
- Garita Agua Zarca – located 21 kilometres (13 mi) south of Nogales, Sonora, on Federal Highway 15 – 31°9′46.74″N 110°57′12.84″W
- Garita San Emeterio – located 27 kilometres (17 mi) south of Sonoyta, Sonora, on Federal Highway 2
- Garita Almejas – located 42 kilometres (26 mi) south of Puerto Peñasco, Sonora, on Federal Highway 37
- Garita Puerto de Janos – located near Janos, Chihuahua, (approximately 235.2 kilometres (146.1 mi) southeast of Agua Prieta, Sonora, on Federal Highway 10).
- Garita de Samalayuca – located 72 kilometres (45 mi) south of Ciudad Juárez, Chihuahua, on Federal Highway 45 – 31°18′9.72″N 106°29′42.06″W
- Garita El Pegüis – located 47 kilometres (29 mi) west of Ojinaga, Chihuahua, on Federal Highway 16
- Garita La Mula – located 47 kilometres (29 mi) south of Ojinaga, Chihuahua, on State Hwy 78.
- Garita Kilómetro 53 – located 52.6 kilometres (32.7 mi) south of Piedras Negras, Coahuila, on Federal Highway 57 – 28°19′1.30″N 100°53′58.05″W
- Garita Camarón – located 55 kilometres (34 mi) south of Colombia, Nuevo León, on State Hwy 1. – 27°18′7.76″N 100°1′2.85″W
- Garita Kilómetro 26 – located 26 kilometres (16 mi) south of Gateway to the Americas International Bridge and Nuevo Laredo, Tamaulipas on Federal Highway 85. Closed in September 2014 due to a change in Mexican law. – 27°16′58.39″N 99°36′29.68″W
- Garita Parás – located 20 kilometres (12 mi) northwest of Ciudad Mier, Tamaulipas, on Federal Highway 30
- Garita Ciudad Mier – located 14 kilometres (8.7 mi) southwest of Ciudad Mier, Tamaulipas, on Federal Highway 54
- Garita Arcabuz – located 50 kilometres (31 mi) south of Ciudad Miguel Alemán, Tamaulipas, on the State Hwy to Los Aldama, Nuevo León
- Garita Kilómetro 35 – located 35 kilometres (22 mi) southwest of Ciudad Camargo, Tamaulipas, on the State Hwy to Peña Blanca, Tamaulipas
- Garita El Vado – located just south of the official Ciudad Gustavo Díaz Ordaz international crossing, Gustavo Díaz Ordaz, Tamaulipas
- Garita Kilómetro 30 – located 32 kilometres (20 mi) southwest of Reynosa, Tamaulipas, on Federal Highway 40 Actual location is within the state of Nuevo León – 25°58′12.89″N 98°35′18.06″W
- Garita Kilómetro 26 – located 26 kilometres (16 mi) south of Reynosa, Tamaulipas, on Federal Highway 97 – 25°52′21.93″N 98°15′49.76″W
- Garita de las Yescas – located 59 kilometres (37 mi) southwest of Matamoros, Tamaulipas, on Federal Highway 101

Garitas along the Mexico–Guatemala Border (listed in order from south to north)

- Garita Viva México – located 8 kilometres (5.0 mi) northwest of Tapachula, Chiapas, on Federal Highway 200
- Garita El Garitón – located 1,360 kilometres (850 mi) southeast of Mexico City on Federal Highway 190 Actual location is several kilometers (miles) northwest of Ciudad Cuauhtémoc, Chiapas
- Garita El Carmen Xhan – located in Carmen Xhan, Chiapas
- Garita San Gregorio Chamic – located 27 kilometres (17 mi) west of Ciudad Cuauhtémoc, Chiapas, on the State Hwy to Comitán de Domínguez, Chiapas
- Garita Tzimol – located near Comitán de Domínguez, Chiapas
- Garita Quija – located 22 kilometres (14 mi) northwest of Comitán de Domínguez, Chiapas, on Federal Highway 190

Garitas in the Yucatán Peninsula

- Garita Nuevo Xcan – located 90 kilometres (56 mi) southwest of Cancún, Quintana Roo, on Federal Highway 180
- Garita Tepich, located 50 kilometres (31 mi) south of Valladolid, Quintana Roo, on Federal Highway 295
- Garita Caobas – located 80 kilometres (50 mi) west of Chetumal, Quintana Roo, on Federal Highway 186
- Garita Dziuché – located 42 kilometres (26 mi) northwest of PolyucMuna, Quintana Roo, on Federal Highway 184
- Garita El Ceibo – located 56 kilometres (35 mi) west of Tenosique, Tabasco, on Federal Highway 203
