= Mexican Federal Highway 198 =

Highway in Mexico

Federal Highway 198
- Carretera federal 198

Route information
- Maintained by Secretariat of Communications and Transportation
- Length: 114.8 km (71.3 mi)

Major junctions
- East end: Fed. 200 in Cruz Grande
- West end: Fed. 95 in Tierra Colorada

Location
- Country: Mexico
- State: Guerrero

Highway system
- Mexican Federal Highways; List; Autopistas
← Fed. 196	→ Fed. 199

Federal Highway 198 (Carretera Federal 198) is a Federal Highway of Mexico. The highway travels from Cruz Grande, Guerrero in the southeast to Tierra Colorada, Guerrero in the northwest.
