= Mexican Federal Highway 95 =

Highway in Mexico

Federal Highway 95
- Carretera federal 95

Route information
- Maintained by Secretariat of Infrastructure, Communications and Transportation
- Length: 361.5 km (224.6 mi)

Major junctions
- North end: Mexico City
- Fed. 106 west of Tres Marias, Morelos Fed. 162 north of Cuernavaca; Fed. 95D in Cuernavaca; Fed. 103 in Michapa; Fed. 55 in Axixintla, Guerrero; Fed. 51 in Iguala; Fed. 196 in Milpillas; Fed. 95D north of Chilpancingo; Fed. 93 in Chilpancingo; Fed. 95D south of Chilpancingo; Fed. 198 in Tierra Colorada Fed. 200 near La Venta
- South end: Fed. 200 in Acapulco, Guerrero

Location
- Country: Mexico

Highway system
- Mexican Federal Highways; List; Autopistas
← Fed. 93	→ Fed. 97

Federal Highway 95 (Carretera Federal 95) connects Mexico City to Acapulco, Guerrero. The Autopista del Sol (The Highway of the Sun) is a tolled alternative (Route 95-D), which bypasses several towns of the state of Guerrero, including the city Iguala, and thus reduces transit time between Acapulco from Mexico city from 8 hours to almost 3.5 hours.

The highway is the main road that leads to the Lagunas de Zempoala National Park. At Tlalpan, Mexico City, the highway serves the Estadio Azteca.

== History ==
The oldest reference to a road between Mexico City and Acapulco date to 1531, when Hernán Cortés ordered the construction of a passage in order to move supplies between the capital and the coastal city. It was converted into a more solid road and received the name Road to Asia due to the passage of wares along it.

In early 1920 Juan R. Escudero, who was originally from Acapulco, asked President Álvaro Obregón to expedite the construction of the road, Escudero offering a group of his men to support the construction work. Obregón agreed and proceeded to improve the sections from Mexico City to Amacuzac and from Iguala to Chilpancingo. A year later, he improved the stretch that runs from Chilpancingo to the south towards Acapulco, and also began a better line of road north of Acapulco.

After the murder of Escudero in late 1923, the emergence of the Huerta rebellion and pressure from the bourgeoisie in Acapulco, the work would be stopped again for a short period. Between 1924 and 1925, the work was restarted by Amadeo S. Vidales, who was appointed head of the Guerrero area, with the support of a group of 328 men, whose salaries he paid.

== Route ==
=== Mexico City ===
Federal Highway 95 begins in Mexico City at the end of the avenues Insurgentes and Viaducto Tlalpan. The road begins heading out towards the south for 6.6 kilometres, passing through the population center of San Andrés Totoltepec. The next 3.4 kilometres ascend the mountainous areas of the Yoyolica volcano, before passing through the population center of Los Angeles. The road continues south through the outskirts of the town of Parras which leads to Chichinautzin Microwave Station. Finally, it covers a stretch of 8.6 km to the town of El Capulin; in this section, it leaves the Federal District and into the state of Morelos.

==== Distances ====
- Leaving Mexico City and San Andres Totoltepec — 6.6 km
- to Los Ángeles — 3.4 km
- Los Ángeles to Parras — 10.12 km
- Parras to El Capulín (Morelos) — 8.6 km

=== Morelos ===
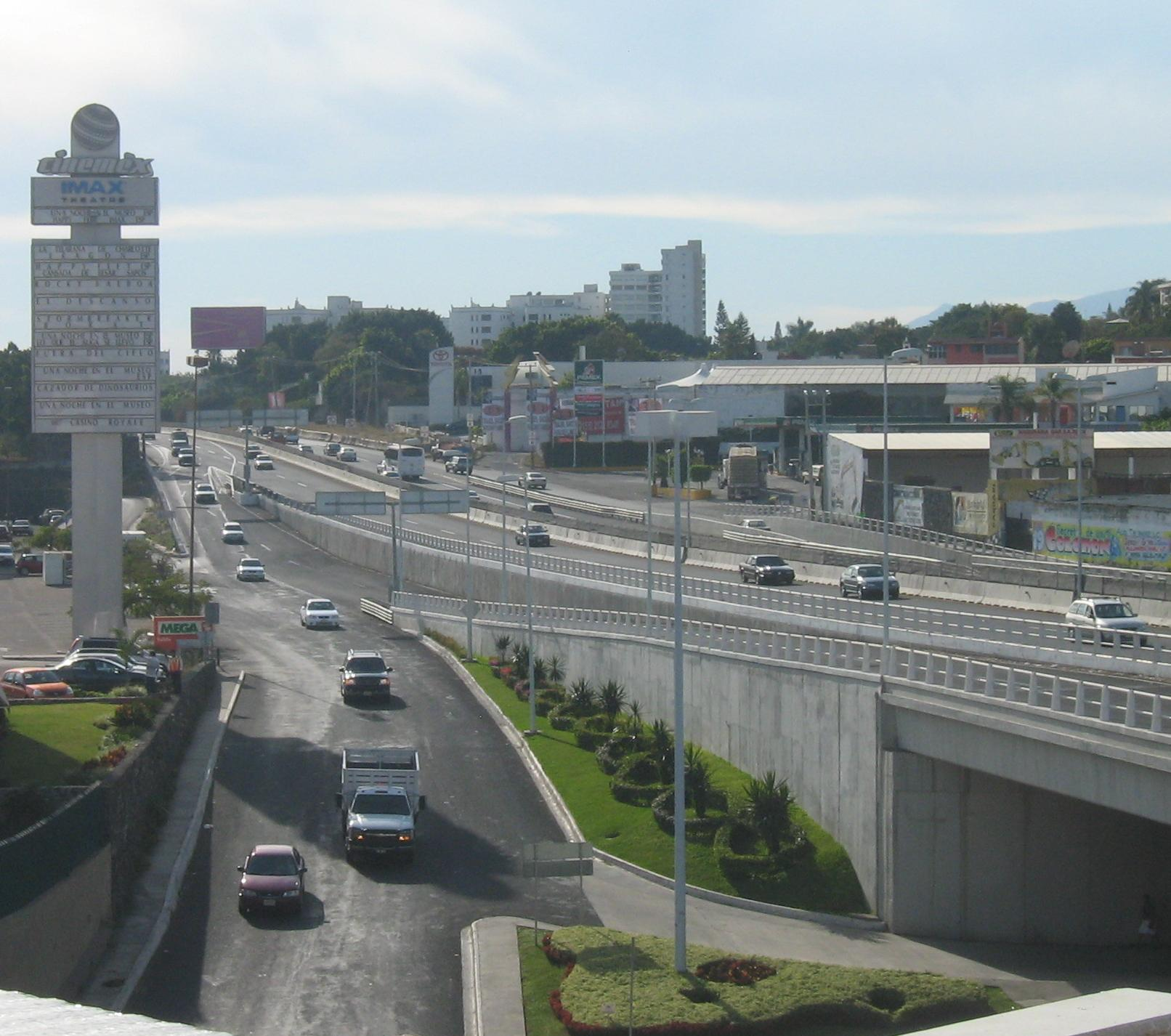
Federal Highway 95 junction in Cuernavaca (view from North to South).

The tollroad comes from the Federal District into the state of Morelos from north to south through the towns of El Capulin and the Tres Marias municipality of Huitzilac to reach the city of Cuernavaca, the state capital. Upon entering Cuernavaca, the road becomes divided Free State Road. Leaving the city, the tollroad continues towards the south to the junction with the road to Cuernavaca Airport. In this area there are a number of junctions that connect the villages of Puente Morelos, Xochitepec and Tletama.

The road continues south to another junction with Highway 166 in the town of Alpuyeca. Highway 166 continues towards the north-west and passes through other areas, such as Miacatlán, Mazatepec, Tetecala de las Reformas, among others. Highway 95 continues south in a stretch with junctions for Coatetelco and Ahuehuetzingo and through the towns of Loma Larga and El Abinico, the latter three belonging to the municipality of Puente de Ixtla. Subsequently, the road crosses near the towns of Puente de Ixtla and San Gabriel de las Palmas to where it joins again with Highway 166 and once again immediately after the city of Amacuzac. In this area, the road changes direction towards the west through the towns of Huajintlán, Teacalco and the town of Casino de la Union. This is the last stretch of the highway before entering the state of Guerrero.

==== Distances ====
- Junction of Huitzilac and Zempoala Lakes National Park to area of Coajomulco - 5 km
- From Coajomulco to the junction at Huitzilac - 9 km
- to Tepoztlan Huitzilac - 6 km
- to the city of Cuernavaca — 5 km
- Cuernavaca to Temixco - 10 km
- to Acatlipa - 3 km
- to the town of Puente Morelos - 2 km
- to Palo Bolero - 5 km
- to the road junction of Xoxocotla - 5 km
- Xoxocotla junction to the junction to Mazatepec - 3 km
- Mazatepec to Ahuehuetzingo - 4 km
- Ahuehuetzingo to Puente de Ixtla - 7 km
- Puente de Ixtla to - 12 km
- Amacuzac the intersection with Federal Highway 55 (at Guerrero) - 16 km

=== Guerrero ===
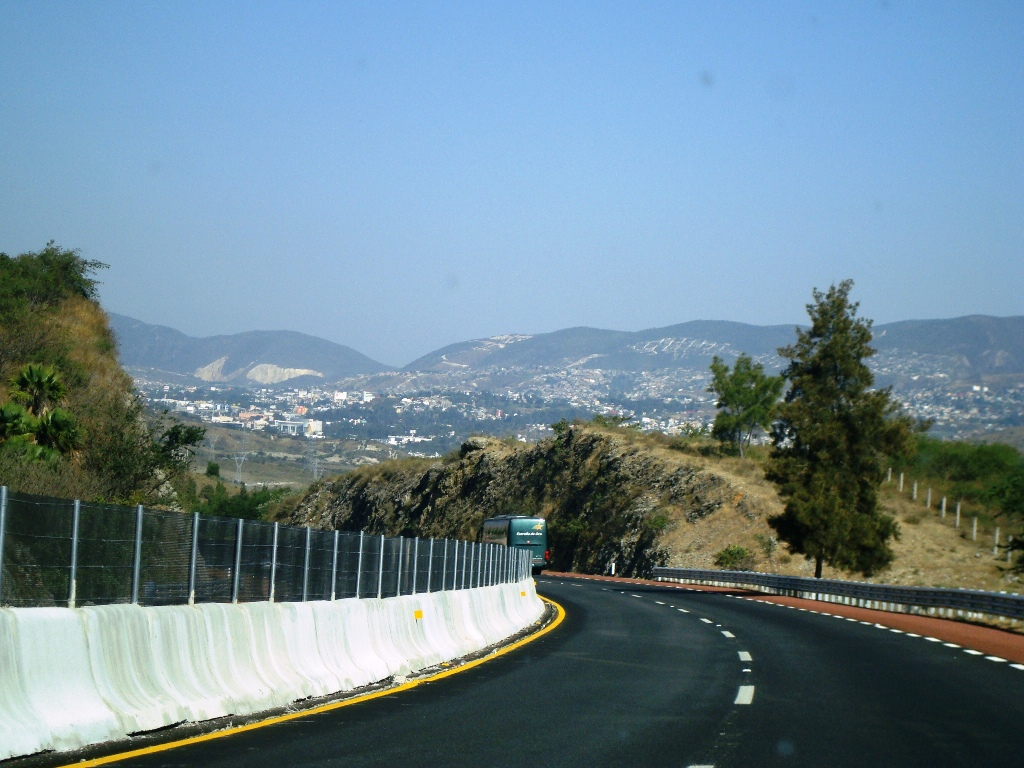
Chilpancingo as seen from Federal Highway 95

In Guerrero, Highway 95 enters near Cacahuamilpa Caves National Park; the road follows its course and enters the city of Ixtapan de la Sal. It continues its path past the area of Tetipac and passing near the town of Acuitlapan and Acamixtla where it reaches the city of Taxco de Alarcón. In this city, the road turns to the south again; it passes Tecalpulco, Taxco el Viejo, Campuzano Puente, San Juan de la Union and Mexcaltepec (all in the municipality of Taxco de Alarcón) and the town of Iguala de la Independencia in El Naranjo.

The road now meets with State Highway 1 which connects the city of Iguala and the city of Tepecoacuilco, Huitzuco. Further south, Highway 95 has more turnoffs to settlements in the municipalities of Iguala de la Independencia and Tepecoacuilco of Trujano como Zacacoyuca, Santa Teresa, Sabana Grande, Sale Palulo, Maxela, Coacoyula Alvarez, Xalitla and Valerio Trujano. From this section, Highway 95 goes into Cañón del Zopilote (Buzzard Canyon), in the municipality of Eduardo Neri, crossing the bridge over the Balsas River (known in this area as Mezcala) and near the town of Mezcal.

Further south, the road meets a junction near the archaeological site at La Organera-Xochipala. Subsequently, it crosses the town of El Pantanal, where there is a free state road that bisects Huitziltepec. The route then crosses through the city from the Zumpango River and then travels 8 miles toward Chilpancingo de los Bravo. The highway joins the Autopista del Sol. Leaving the urban area, the road provides access to Mazatlan, Palo Blanco, Agua de Obispo, Rincon de la Via, Ocotito and Julian Blanco which belongs to Municipality of Chilpancingo de los Bravo. The road enters the town of Juan R. Escudero and through the Tierra Colorada and then out toward the west-southwest and across the Papagayo River. It is at this point that the road enters the city of Acapulco and passes near the town of El Playon, through the town of Xaltianguis and on a bridge over the Potrerillos River and the locations of El Cuarenta y Cinco and Cuarenta y Dos. In the latter there is a crossing that leads to Piedra Iman and La Providencia. Later, it passes near the towns of El Cuerenta and El Treinta y Cuatro, which features a turnoff linking the towns of Dos Arroyos, Colonia Guerrero, Altos de Camaron and Venta Vieja.

Finally, Highway 95 passes near the town of Lomas de San Juan and meets with Highway 200 from the region of Costa Chica; Highway 200 and 95 come together in an attempt to bypass the city of Acapulco. The road crosses around the towns of El Veintiuno, El Paso Quemado, and Limon and finally to the city of Acapulco.
