= Mexican Federal Highway 221 =

Highway in Mexico

Federal Highway 221
- Carretera federal 221

Route information
- Maintained by Secretariat of Infrastructure, Communications and Transportation

Location
- Country: Mexico

Highway system
- Mexican Federal Highways; List; Autopistas
← Fed. 211	→ Fed. 225

Federal Highway 221 (Carretera Federal 221) is a Federal Highway of Mexico. It stretches from Nuevo Coahuila and junctions with Federal Highway 186, near Ojo de Agua, Campeche.

== Major intersections ==
The entire route is in Campeche.

Municipality	Location	km	mi	Destinations	Notes
Candelaria	Nuevo Coahuila			Calle 02	Southern terminus
Candelaria				SH 186 – El Naranjo	
Carmen	No major junctions				
Candelaria	No major junctions				
Carmen				Fed. 186 – Villahermosa, Palizada, Campeche, Escárcega	Northern terminus
1.000 mi = 1.609 km; 1.000 km = 0.621 mi
