= Mexican Federal Highway 98 =

Highway in Mexico

Federal Highway 98
- Carretera federal 98

Route information
- Maintained by Secretariat of Infrastructure, Communications and Transportation
- Length: 58.5 km (36.4 mi)

Major junctions
- East end: Minatitlán
- West end: Pez Vela Junction, Colima

Location
- Country: Mexico
- State: Colima

Highway system
- Mexican Federal Highways; List; Autopistas
← Fed. 97	→ Fed. 101

Federal Highway 98 (Carretera Federal 98) is a Federal Highway of Mexico. The highway travels from Minatitlán, Colima in the northeast to Pez Vela Junction, Colima to the southwest. From Minatitlán, the highway continues on as a Colima state route to Colima City.
