= Mexican Federal Highway 199 =

Highway in Mexico

Federal Highway 199
- Carretera federal 199

Route information
- Maintained by Secretariat of Infrastructure, Communications and Transportation
- Length: 210 km (130 mi)

Major junctions
- South end: Fed. 190 at Rancho Nuevo, Chiapas
- Fed. 307 at Palenque, Chiapas
- North end: Fed. 186 at Catazajá, Chiapas

Location
- Country: Mexico
- State: Chiapas

Highway system
- Mexican Federal Highways; List; Autopistas
← Fed. 198	→ Fed. 200

Federal Highway 199 (Carretera Federal 199) is a Federal Highway of Mexico located in Chiapas, connecting Mexican Federal Highway 190 at Rancho Nuevo to Catazajá.
