= Mexican Federal Highway 103 =

Highway in Mexico

Federal Highway 103
- Carretera federal 103

Route information
- Maintained by Secretariat of Communications and Transportation
- Length: 16.22 km (10.08 mi)

Major junctions
- North end: Fed. 166 in Michapa, Morelos
- South end: Fed. 95 in Amacuzac

Location
- Country: Mexico
- State: Morelos

Highway system
- Mexican Federal Highways; List; Autopistas
| ← Fed. 102 | → Fed. 105 |

Federal Highway 103 (Carretera Federal 103) is a Federal Highway of Mexico. The highway connects Michapa, Morelos at Mexican Federal Highway 166 in the north to Amacuzac, Morelos at Mexican Federal Highway 95 in the south.
