= Mexican Federal Highway 211 =

Highway in Mexico

Federal Highway 211
- Carretera federal 211
- Carretera Federal 211

Route information
- Maintained by Secretariat of Infrastructure, Communications and Transportation
- Length: 126 km (78 mi)

Major junctions
- North end: Fed. 190 in El Jocote, Chiapas
- South end: Fed. 200 in Huixtla, Chiapas

Location
- Country: Mexico
- State: Chiapas

Highway system
- Mexican Federal Highways; List; Autopistas
← Fed. 203	→ Fed. 221

Federal Highway 211 (Carretera Federal 211) is a Federal Highway of Mexico. The highway travels from El Jocote, Chiapas in the northeast to Huixtla, Chiapas in the southwest.
