= Siege of Mexico City =

1867 military engagement

- Part of the Second French intervention in Mexico
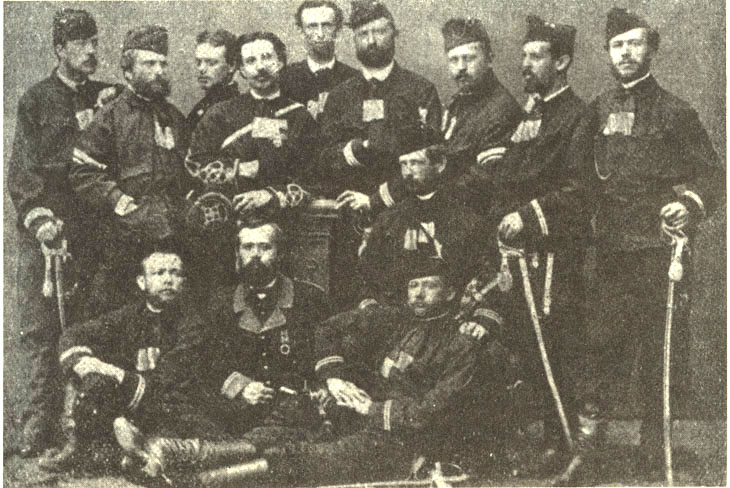
- Austrian volunteers in Mexico, 1866
Date	12 April – 21 June 1867 (2 months, 1 week and 2 days)
Location	Mexico City, Mexico
Result	Mexican Republican victory: Collapse of the Second Mexican Empire; Withdrawal of the French from Mexico

Belligerents
Mexican Empire; France; Austria-Hungary	Mexico; (United States) American volunteers

Commanders and leaders
(Second Mexican Empire) Leonardo Márquez (POW) (surrendered); (Second Mexican Empire) Ramon Tabera (POW) (surrendered); (Second Mexican Empire) Tomás O'Horán (executed) ^{[a]}; (Second Mexican Empire) Santiago Vidaurri (POW) (executed); (Second Mexican Empire) Manuel Ramirez Arellano (POW); (Austria-Hungary) Johann Karl Khevenhüller (surrendered): (Austria-Hungary) Armin Freiherr von Hammerstein-Equord †; (Austria-Hungary) Alfons von Kodolitsch (surrendered); (Austria-Hungary) János Csizmadia (surrendered)	(Second Federal Republic of Mexico) Porfirio Díaz; (Second Federal Republic of Mexico) Félix Díaz; (Second Federal Republic of Mexico) Manuel González Flores; (Second Federal Republic of Mexico) Venancio Leyva; (Second Federal Republic of Mexico) Edelmiro Mayer; (Second Federal Republic of Mexico) Mariano Escobedo; John Sobieski

Units involved
(Mexico) 1st brigade of infantry (Mexico) Regiment of Quiroga (Second French Empire) 18th regiment of infantry (Second French Empire) Regiment of chasseurs à cheval (French light cavalry) (Second French Empire) Regiment of gendarmes (Austria-Hungary) Regiment of hussars	(Mexico) Eastern Army (United States) American Legion of Honor

Casualties and losses
100+ killed 304 wounded 1,000 captured	Unknown

The siege of Mexico City was an 1867 military engagement in the Second French intervention in Mexico between Republican forces, aided by the United States, and Emperor Maximilian's troops, aided by the French Empire and Austria-Hungary, encompassing in the siege of the city. It was the last armed conflict of the Second Mexican Empire and the fall of the city resulted in the transition of the Empire into the Republic led by Benito Juárez.

== Circumstances ==
Mexico City was occupied by the French Army. The French decided to withdraw the last of their corps on 5 February 1867 a week after the Emperor Maximilian also left Mexico City for Querétaro accompanied by his Imperial guards. On the 21st, Republican General Vicente Riva Palacio and Diego Álvarez Benítez arrived near the city with 4,000 soldiers. On the Imperialist side, General Leonardo Márquez marched to assume supreme command of the city. On his way to Mexico City Máquez was routed at San Lorenzo by Díaz. Márquez fled with his cavalry leaving the rest of the infantry behind. Colonel Kodolitsch saved the day by marching out and forming a rearguard to protect the retreating troops and bring them into the city. On 12 May all the foreign commanders agreed that they needed to prepare a secondary plan in case General Márquez' actions endangered their own men. They elected Colonel Khevenhüller as the acting Commander-in-Chief in case of the necessity to remove Márquez. They also agreed that in negotiating any ceasefire agreement they would act together to reach their own independent terms regardless of the Mexicans'. The capital was defended by 400 cannons. On the 2nd Republican forces seized the railroad line of Apizaco and started to transport the war material from Puebla by train. On the 15th General Porfirio Díaz arrived at Villa Guadalupe, where he tried to surround Villa Guadalupe, but was prevented by the Imperial artillery. The French counterguerillas who defended the village withdrew to the fortified garitas at San Lázaro, Vallejo and in the Peralvillo. These positions were already entrenched and defended by five hundred Austrians and two hundred Mexicans. The Austrian column was commanded by von Hammerstein, who was shot in the trenches on 25 May 1867. The communication and supply lines of the capital were shut down on 18th with the arrival Díaz' 12,000 soldiers.

The Republicans were in a hurry to force the city to surrender as the rainy weather of autumn would prevent any further military action to be taken. Upon his arrival Díaz proclaimed that his intents were to arrest General Márquez, Tomás O'Horán and the former Minister of State. He also stated that he would execute all the Austrian auxiliaries if they were captured. The lives of Francophone soldiers would be spared since 60% of his own cavalry consisted of French deserters. On 20 April Agnes Salm-Salm, a Prussian princess in Imperial service, appeared at Díaz's camp and offered the disbandment of the European troops in exchange for the guarantee of their and Maximilian's lives and free passage back to Europe. Although her offer was not accepted she tried to further convince Díaz by sending word that the Austro-Hungarian troops were put on hold and under the temporary protection of the neutral Prussian flag as of 26th inst.

== Siege ==
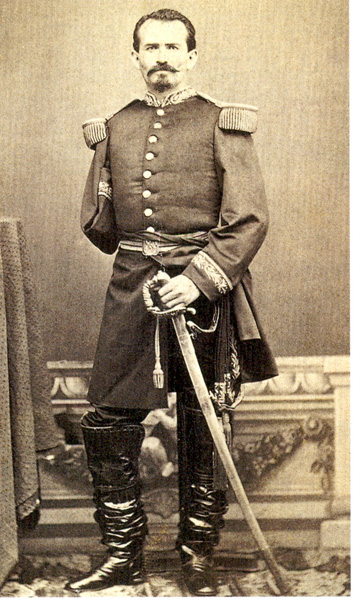
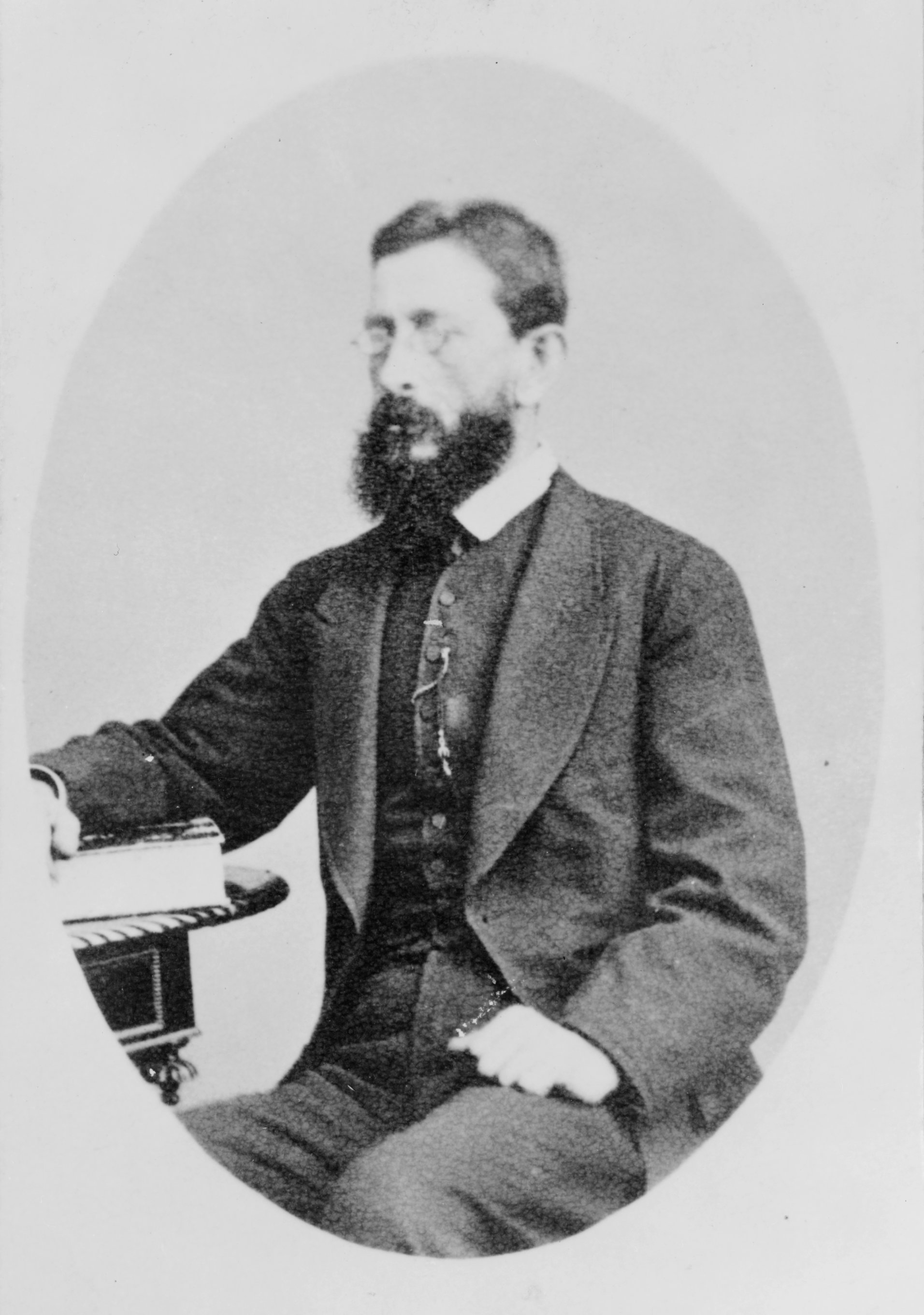
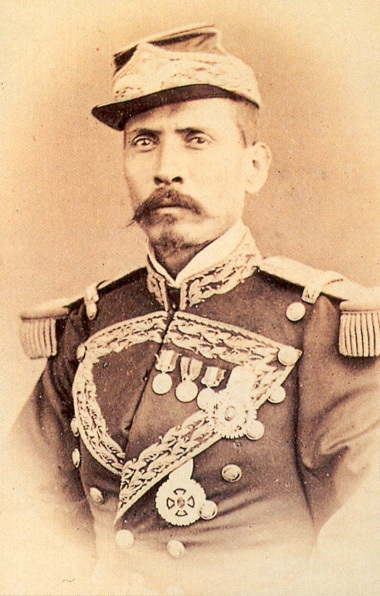
Republican officers of the siege: Manuel González Flores (left), Mariano Escobedo (center) and Porfirio Díaz (right)

On 17 May Querétaro fell and Maximilian was taken prisoner and the 15,000 troops of General Mariano Escobedo were redirected to assist in the siege of the capital. On 23 May, Porfirio Díaz tightened the ring around the city and advanced to Tacubaya and was confronted by the French guerrillas at Belén on 30 May who held them back until 9 June when they were called to reassemble at San Antonio Abad.

Meanwhile, the famine within the city became unbearable. It was reported that half of the population of 220,000 had fled from the city during the siege. There was an instance when 14,000 inhabitants left in one day. The famine was so severe it caused a minor rebellion within the local residents. On 8 June, rumors had it that a great quantity of grain was hidden in the Iturbide Theatre. The mob broke its entrances and flooded the building. Some amount of cereals was found which was immediately plundered. The riot escalated and reached the marketplace, threatening to pillage it. In fear that this would have led to greater conflict between the garrison and the civilians and to prevent the gates being opened and city delivered to the Republicans, the Austro-Hungarian cavalry raided the crowd and dispersed it. No weapons were used in order to avoid panic and an anti-Imperialist morale to arise. To prevent further riots, all hidden food stores were revealed by house-to-house searches and distributed by the hussars and gendarmes among the people.

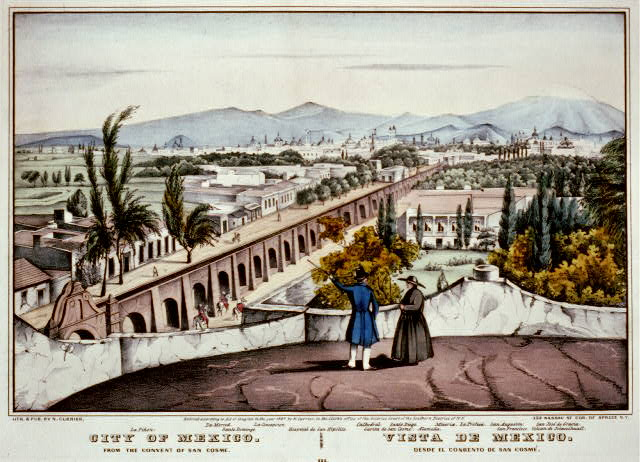
The attacked aqueduct at the garita leading to the city

On 14 June, General of artillery Ramírez Arellano arrived to the region and after having himself disguised as a charcoal-burner, infiltrated into the city and gave reports about the current situation of the Empire. Márquez took the opportunity to spread rumors of an Imperial victory in Querétaro and used the arrival of Arellano as a forged evidence for that. As soon as the rumors spread that the Emperor was victorious in Querétaro and he was on his way to relieve the capital, a great feast was held in the city. Díaz saw the fiesta as an opportunity to break the stalemate while the city was distracted with their celebration. At noon, he unexpectedly attacked San Cosme and Belén, sneaking with his soldiers one by one through an aqueduct. The native Indians and the French took up the arms against the surprise attack. They charged two cannons with grapeshots and targeted both sides of the aqueduct, while six men mounted it to cut the only possible escape route. The Liberals tried to take initiative three times, all of which were repulsed and they retreated. At the end of the assault attempt several hundred Liberals were found dead in the field.

On the 18th the French and Austrian commanders met where the latter informed the guerillas that the Emperor was taken prisoner and that they proclaimed their neutrality for the rest of the battle and were already in negotiations with the Republicans. The French Commander Chenet referred to their previous agreement, in which they agreed that they wouldn't surrender without the consent of the other. The next day all Europeans put down their weapons and awaited until the end of the siege. The French were residing at San Pedro y San Pablo, while the other Europeans occupied the National Palace.

As the funds were running low General Márquez engrossed $150,000 from the Barron, Forbes & Co. and impounded $60,000 more on the Nacional Monte de Piedad. No supplies could reach the city after it had been surrounded and as a result food stores ran empty and the forced levies just worsened the situation. Only three bakeries were still open to furnish the soldiers and the remaining two hundred thousand inhabitants. House raids were everyday common for hidden foodstocks. Still hundreds of people died of the famine. Every sort of commerce was completely suspended.

=== Breakout attempts ===
==== First ====
The first breakout attempt took place on 18 May. The Imperial Mexican infantry was dispersed easily. A dismounted cavalry company intervened and assaulted the Republican ramparts, only to open the road for Colonel Kodolitsch to search for provisions in the nearby territory. After gathering enough rural goods, the Imperialists returned to the city.

==== Second ====
The second breakout commenced on Sunday at 2 o'clock in the morning of 9 June after preparing a plan to occupy the Santa Fe fort in order to secure the route into the city. Márquez still believed that the Emperor would arrive at the city with the rest of the army. At 4 am the "red Hussars" of Khevenhüller unified with the French counterguerillas at San Antonio Abad. At 5 am joined by regiment of gendarmes and the brigade of Quiroga they attacked the Republicans. The French were left in reserve. At 6 am General Tabera ordered a feint attack towards the Piedad river. The operation succeeded in piercing the enemy lines though all of his troops had to return to the city.

==== Third ====
The third and last breakout was led by Márquez himself, which was an undercover attempt to escape the capital and leave it to its fate as he received worrisome information regarding the fall of Querétaro and the capture of Maximilian. On the night of 17 June at the head of 6,000 men they marched through the Cuartos bridge in the direction of La Piedad. He was stopped by Díaz in person there who came from Tacubaya when he heard the cannon fire. At that time Colonel Leyva's battalion was nearly destroyed and Cuartos bridge had been almost taken when Díaz took command of the first battalion of Oaxaca lancers from General Terán, and reinforced the remnants of the Republicans. He was shortly followed by Terán's second and third Lancer battalion, General Naranjo and his Los Morales cavalry and Félix Díaz from Coyoacán. The Imperialists had no other way back but to pass the same bridge they came, which was covered by the fire of Díaz's artillery causing great losses to Márquez's forces

=== Negotiations ===
==== Díaz and O'Horán ====
On the 18th the Mexican Imperial General O'Horán persuaded Díaz to meet him halfway at night and used red light signals to identify himself while sneaking out undiscovered from the capital. Díaz escorted by drummers and buglers responded with the same signal, that unfortunately revealed his position to the Imperialist shooters who instantly opened fire on him. O'Horán blamed Márquez for the incident and swore his innocence. The second night O'Horán came out of the capital and met Díaz, which they did this time. He offered to surrender the city, including Márquez and the other principal officers, with the sole condition of obtaining a passport to go abroad. Díaz felt that such an offer was pointless considering the city was helpless, and that as for the other leaders I would fulfill my duty. O'Horán insisted that however the city would fall the capture of the wanted officers was uncertain, but his offer guaranteed both. Díaz refused again and warned the General that although he let him get away that time he would put him under custody as soon as the city was to be captured.

==== Díaz and Khevenhüller ====
News circulated within the capital that Querétaro had fallen. Upon his capture Maximilian wrote to Anton von Magnus, the Prussian minister to Mexico residing in Mexico City, and called for him to go to his prison and provide legal counseling before his trial. The Austrian commanders was suspicious and thought of that letter as a falsified one and wasn't conveyed by the telegraph. Avoiding a possible trick they asked the Prussian Baronto to find out the truth behind the courrier by indirectly requesting the Emperor to send a hand-written signed letter to clarify his will on the continuation of military matters. After local merchants confirmed the arrest of the Emperor, Colonel Kodolitsch declared and insisted that the foreign troops would continue to defend the city no matter what. On the 17th, Baron Eduard Lago, the Austrian chargé d'affaires, who had been released Querétaro on 2 June and returned to Tacubaya on the 16th, sent a mail on the same day to Colonel Khevenhüller, in which he assured to obtain a signed letter from the Emperor that ordered all officers of Austrian nationality to abstain from any further bloodshed. The Austrians were then convinced of its reliability and decided to cease hostilities immediately and asked Lago for mediation at Díaz. They insisted though to all their military honours, their neutrality, and protection, required to be escorted on the retreat of their troops to Vera Cruz, and assurance of their maintenance until their embarquement at the said port. All terms had been settled in an agreement, which was as follows:

# Art.; The basis of this present agreement is, that the Austrian soldiers shall desist from the present moment from any participation in any hostility against the Republican army.

1. Art.; If they leave the capital on the 20th inst., and report themselves at the headquarters of the said army, General Porfirio Díaz warrants to all of them free retreat to Vera Cruz without an escort, and at the expense of the Republican government, and he warrants also the baggage. The officers will remain in the possession of their arms and horses; all other arms and horses will be delivered up to the general-in-chief.
2. Art.; In the case that the above-mentioned time should pass without any use having been made of these promises, however, with observation of the principle expressed in section 1, if the soldiers, in case of a fight, should assemble in the palace, and hoist the white flag, the General Porfirio Díaz warrants, in the case of the capture of Mexico, the lives only of the Austrian soldiers, leaving them otherwise at the disposal of the Republican government.
3. Art.; Those persons who, in one of the above-mentioned cases, should desire to remain in the country, will receive from the general the required security for their person and baggage.
4. Art.; In reference to those who, being at distant posts, could not be informed in time, this circumstance would find consideration only until the morning of the 21st inst., later they would only have a right to claim the promises of section 3, made to those who should retire to the palace.
5. Art.; In all these conditions granted to Austrians are included all those who, without belonging to the Mexican nation, are under the same command. As to the Mexicans, General Porfirio Díaz cannot anticipate the decision of the Republican government, by granting them conditions which might be prejudicial to its resolutions.
6. Art.; General Porfirio Díaz desires to be informed in time of the marching out from Mexico, in order to be able to assist it by all means at his disposal.

— The chargé d'affaires of Austria, Baron Lago., Tacubaya, 19th June, 1867.
to Colonel Count Ch. de Khevenhueller, Mexico.

Although the agreement had never been ratified it came into effect on the day of the general surrender, they presented themselves disarmed at the National Palace at the time of the Republican takeover.

==== Díaz and Tabera ====
On 17 June General Ramón Tabera Commanding-General of the Second Army Corps began to make contact with Díaz, though returned without accomplishing anything. He assumed high command when Márquez disappeared from the city on the evening of 19 June with the rest of the treasury. A theory suggested he was smuggled alive by foreign Republican volunteers in a coffin to one of the cemeteries and set to travel at midnight. He was dressed as a fruit peddler to reach safely Vera Cruz. Other account claims he went to one of his confidant, a miller with his compatriot O'Horán. Marcus Otterbourg, the United States Consul General tried to deliver a truce proposition that the city would surrender in exchange for the prohibition of death sentences upon the garrison. Díaz refused to listen to the proposition, and allowed a few minutes for him to return. After he passed the Equestrian statue of Charles IV the shelling resumed. After realising the absence of Márquez white flags were raised on the city buildings, and the call for a capitulation was signaled to the besiegers. The official message was delivered to Díaz by Miguel Peña, Díaz de la Vega and Carlos Palafox on the behalf and consent of Tabera. The agreement was as follows:

# Art.; All Firing will immediately cease until the ratification of these articles

1. Art.; The life, property and liberty of the population of Mexico is to rest in the care of General Porfirio Díaz
2. Art.; General Ramon Tabera will nominate three persons to form a Commission, who will place the city in the power of General Díaz, as follows: One of these persons will trun over the troops of the garrison; one of the Government property; and the other the artillery and munitions of war
3. Art.; The national or native Imperial forces are to form in line and march to the Citadel, where they will remain until formally surrendered. The contra-guerilla under Chenet will concentrate in the suburbs called San Pedro and San Paulo and foreign troops in the palace
4. Art.; the Commanding-Generals, Chiefs and commissioned officers will retain their espadas, swords, and present themselves as afterward as directed by the Commander-in-Chief (Díaz) and remain where ordered until further orders

— Ignacio Alatorre
Miguel Peña
Díaz de la Vega
Carlos Palafox, Chapultepec, 20 June 1867

==== Díaz and Csizmadia ====
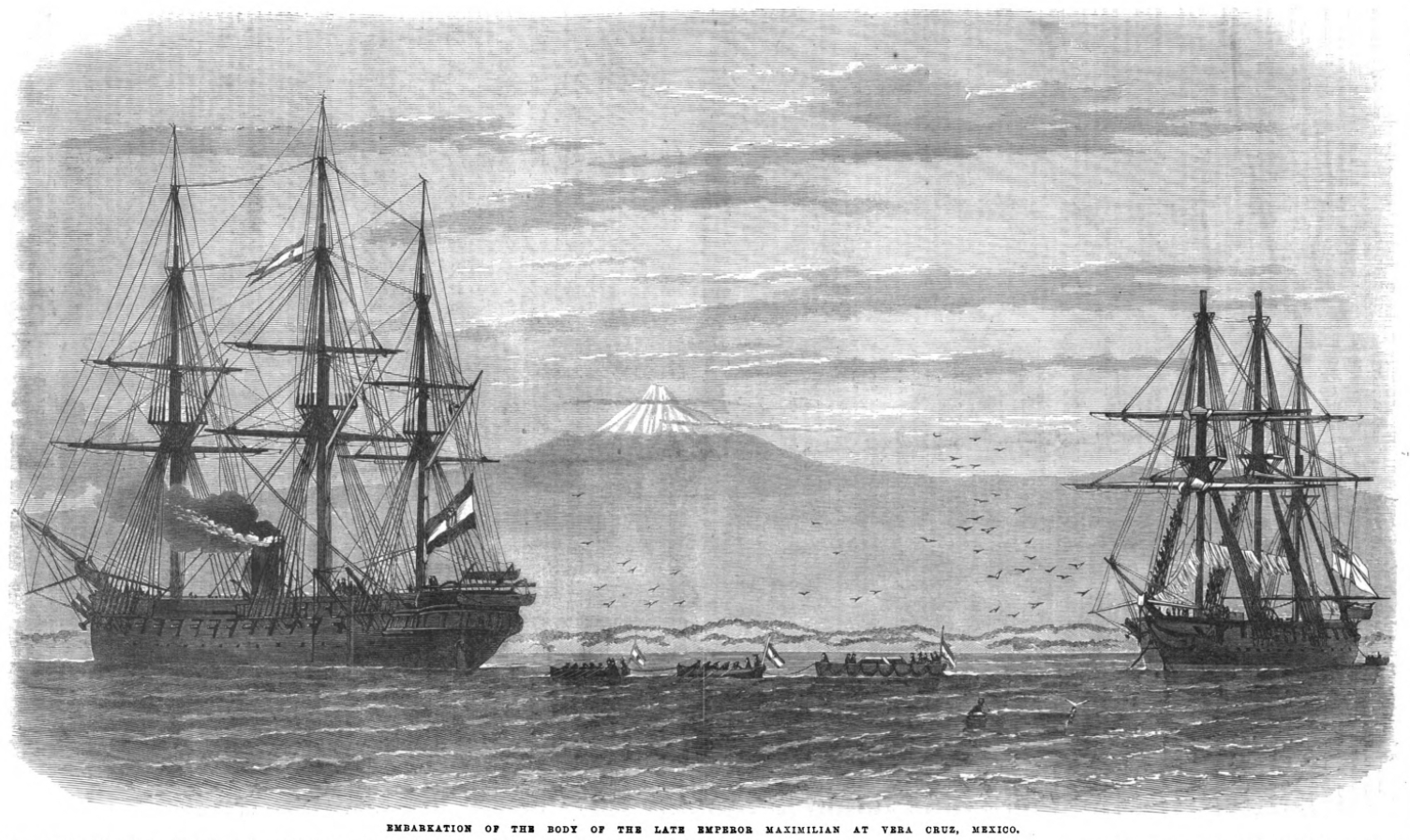
Austrian ship SMS Novara coming for the discharged officers

After the siege General Díaz was informed that Hungarian troops are present in the city. At the moment the Hungarian cavalry found shelter in the National Palace, when Díaz personally sent for Major Csizmadia and granted him a meeting. The two had known each other for quite a long time as Csizmadia served as a prison lieutenant in Puebla when Díaz was held as captive there. On one occasion Díaz refused to be taken to the bathroom by a low-rank prison guard when Csizmadia offered to personally escort him there, which was an unusual courtesy. He even invited the General for a lunch at his house, who accepted it. The lieutenant dealt with his inmate amicably and they even attended a bullfight together. Díaz only refused a closer friendship to evolve because he feared to having been labeled pro-Imperialist, and that would have ruined his image. On 20 September 1865 he successfully escaped from the prison using a rope and a dagger with the acquiescence and consent of the Hungarian officer. He praised Csizmadia's generous and noble attitude towards him several times in his later memoirs. This was the reason he was looking for the captured Csizmadia after the siege and allowed him and his Hungarian regiment to move to Vera Cruz and to be taken home on the board of the Austrian ship SMS Novara along with the rest of the Austrian corps. Csizmadia also helped to negotiate the same terms of surrender for the Austrians as well.

=== Final days ===
Feeling that the end was near, Leonardo Márquez escaped from the capital, went into exile and passed the leadership to Ramón Tabera on 20 June, who immediately negotiated a surrender, which Díaz accepted and entered the city the following day. After taking measures for the maintaining the order and supplying food to the inhabitants Díaz sent out for the Imperialist officers, as well as ministers, councilors, administrators of the previous regime to present themselves voluntarily within a twenty-four-hour period. The only ones who did so were General Tabera and a few others. Díaz had three prisons prepared for the high class subordinates of the Empire each reserved to different branches of the same rank. Unprovoked punishment of the prisoners was prohibited. Their families and friends could freely visit them. The sick were permitted to remain at their homes. Many of them failed to show up and search-groups were formed to enforce the warrants. Among these were Vidaurri, Lacunza, O'Horán, and Manuel Ramírez Arellano but many of them were later arrested. Juan José Baz, newly appointed Chief of the Police of the Capital of the Mexican Republic proclaimed on 21 June:

# Art.; All who have been employed in whatever occupation under the so-called Empire, receiving pay from the same, must present themselves at these headquarters within twenty-four hours

1. Art.; All such who do not present themselves within the above-mentioned period, will be considered, when found, as enemies of the Government with arms in their hands, and will be punished with penalty of death, according to Article 28 of the law of Jan. 25, 1862.
2. Art.; All who were of the "Assembly of Nobles", counselors, heads of departments, Imperial commissionaries, the same as those who were in the military service, are to remain in prison until their cases are disposed of by the Supreme Government.
3. Art.; Those who served as captains or lieutenants remain in liberty, but must present themselves in order to obtain exemption papers, allowing them to remain until further orders in the place of their choice; provided the same persons have not committed any act which places them under a different category. Such as have committed excesses will remain in prison until judged.
4. Art.; All the inhabitants of Mexico are ordered to let their houses be searched by officers who show written orders for making such searches, and which orders are given by the Chief of Police. Those who resist, and their houses are searched by force, will suffer a fine of $100 to $500, or six months' to two years' imprisonment.
5. Art.; Those who attempt to search houses without an order from this Department will be punished with not less than six months or nor more than five years at hard work.
6. Art.; Those who hide individuals in their houses, who are included in this decree, will be punished with not less than six months' imprisonment or nor more than five years at hard work. Those who are exempt of this punishment are those who hide father, son, brother or husband.
7. Art.; All who have in their possession jewelry, plate, furniture, or other property properly belonging to the nation, are obliged to give them in the hands of the City Treasury within the period of twenty-four hours, and such as do not conform of this article will be considered and dealt with the same as common thieves, and punished according to the criminal circular (of Diaz) of April 27, 1807.
8. Art.; All who have arms, ammunition or articles of war belonging to the Government, will turn them over to the Inspector of Police within twenty-four hours, or suffer six months' imprisonment to one year's hard work.
9. Art.; The Punishment spoken in Articles 5, 6, 7 and 9 will be applied by Government.

— Juan José Baz, Mexico City, 21 June 1867

Finally President Juárez ceremonially visited the city on 21 July and issued a general amnesty. Army was reduced to 18,000 conscripts.

== See also ==
- List of battles of the French intervention in Mexico

== Notes ==
- ^{a} Accounts differ who ordered the execution by firing squad of Tomás O'Horán. Charles d'Héricault claims it was Benito Juárez's wish. In his letter to the legation of the United States Marcus Otterbourg also confirmed O'Horán's post-siege Republican trial and the execution as its verdict. James Creelman also links his execution to Juárez. The contemporary The New York Times reported that he was put on trial by Márquez and executed for treason.
