= Mexican Federal Highway 105 =

Highway in Mexico

Federal Highway 105
- Carretera federal 105

Route information
- Maintained by Secretariat of Infrastructure, Communications and Transportation
- Length: 260.68 km (161.98 mi)

Major junctions
- North end: Fed. 127 in Tempoal de Sánchez
- Fed. 102 south of Huejutla de Reyes
- South end: Fed. 130 in Pachuca

Location
- Country: Mexico

Highway system
- Mexican Federal Highways; List; Autopistas
← Fed. 103	→ Fed. 106

Federal Highway 105 (Carretera Federal 105) is a Federal Highway of Mexico. The highway travels from Tempoal de Sánchez, Veracruz, in the north to Pachuca, Hidalgo, in the south.
