= Mexican Federal Highway 225 =

Highway in Mexico

Federal Highway 225
- Carretera federal 225

Route information
- Maintained by Secretariat of Infrastructure, Communications and Transportation

Location
- Country: Mexico
- State: Chiapas

Highway system
- Mexican Federal Highways; List; Autopistas
← Fed. 221	→ Fed. 254

Federal Highway 225 (Carretera Federal 225) is a Federal Highway of Mexico. It runs from Port Chiapas on the Pacific Ocean to the city of Tapachula, Chiapas.
