= Mexican Federal Highway 172 =

Highway in Mexico

Federal Highway 172
- Carretera federal 172

Route information
- Maintained by Secretariat of Infrastructure, Communications and Transportation
- Length: 29.3 km (18.2 mi)

Major junctions
- East end: Coatzacoalcos
- West end: Fed. 180D in Minatitlán

Location
- Country: Mexico
- State: Veracruz

Highway system
- Mexican Federal Highways; List; Autopistas
← Fed. 166	→ Fed. 175

Federal Highway 172 (Carretera Federal 172) is a Federal Highway of Mexico. The highway travels from Minatitlán, Veracruz in the west to Coatzacoalcos, Veracruz in the east. Federal Highway 172 serves as a bypass of Mexican Federal Highway 180 in Coatzacoalcos and is also the route leading from Minatitlán city proper to Minatitlán/Coatzacoalcos International Airport.
