= Mexican Federal Highway 106 =

Highway in Mexico

Federal Highway 106
- Carretera federal 106

Route information
- Maintained by Secretariat of Infrastructure, Communications and Transportation
- Length: 28.35 km (17.62 mi)

Major junctions
- East end: Fed. 95 in Tres Marias
- West end: Santa Martha

Location
- Country: Mexico

Highway system
- Mexican Federal Highways; List; Autopistas
← Fed. 105	→ Fed. 107

Federal Highway 106 (Carretera Federal 106) is a Federal Highway of Mexico. The highway is a short connector route that links Tres Marias, Morelos in the east to Santa Martha, State of Mexico in the west.
