= Battle of Puebla =

Part of the French intervention in Mexico

Coordinates: 19.05°N 98.20°W

- Part of the Second French intervention in Mexico
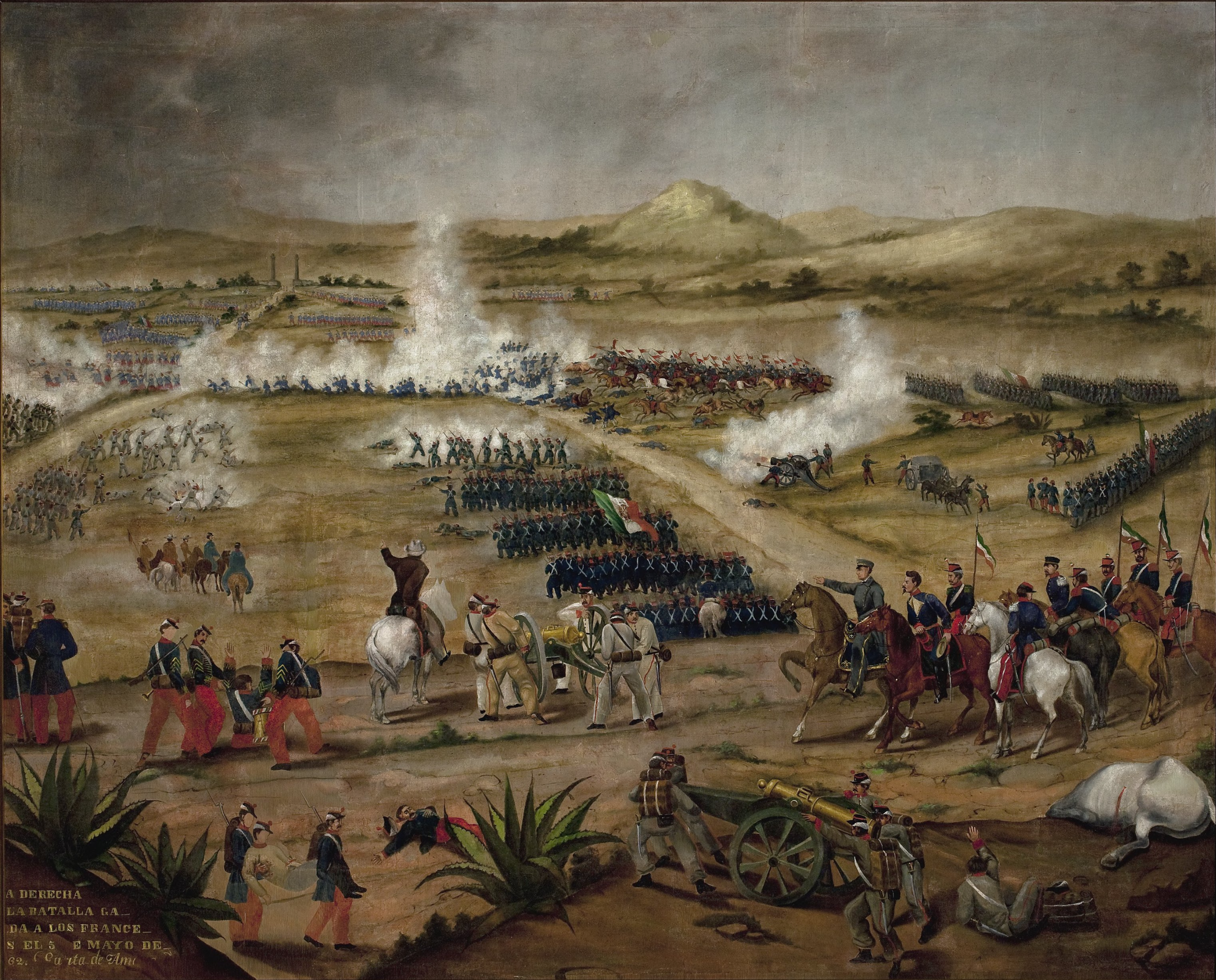
- Battle of May 5, 1862
Date	May 5, 1862
Location	Puebla, Puebla, Mexico
Result	Mexican victory

Belligerents
Mexico	France

Commanders and leaders
Ignacio Zaragoza; Porfirio Díaz; Miguel Negrete; Felipe Berriozábal	Charles de Lorencez

Strength
3,791	5,730

Casualties and losses
87 killed 252 wounded 12 missing Total: 351 men	131 killed 345 wounded Total: 476 men

The Battle of Puebla (Spanish: Batalla de Puebla; French: Bataille de Puebla), also known as the Battle of the Fifth of May (Spanish: Batalla del Cinco de Mayo) took place on 5 May 1862, near Puebla de los Ángeles, during the second French intervention in Mexico. French troops under the command of Charles de Lorencez repeatedly failed to storm the forts of Loreto and Guadalupe situated on top of the hills overlooking the city of Puebla, and eventually retreated to Orizaba in order to await reinforcements. Lorencez was dismissed from his command, and French troops under Élie Frédéric Forey eventually took the city, but the Mexican victory at Puebla against a better equipped force provided patriotic inspiration to the Mexicans.

The anniversary of the victory is primarily celebrated in the Mexican state of Puebla, where the holiday is celebrated as El Día de la Batalla de Puebla (English: The Day of the Battle of Puebla). There is some limited recognition of the holiday in other parts of the country. In the United States, Cinco de Mayo has evolved into a holiday celebration of Mexican heritage.

== Background ==
=== The Tripartite Expedition ===
The French intervention in Mexico, initially supported by the United Kingdom and Spain, was a consequence of Mexican President Benito Juárez's imposition of a two-year moratorium of loan-interest payments from July 1861 to French, British, and Spanish creditors.

On December 14, 1861, a Spanish fleet sailed into and took possession of the port of Veracruz. The city was occupied on the 17th. French and British forces arrived on January 7, 1862. On January 10 a manifesto was issued by Spanish General Juan Prim disavowing rumors that the allies had come to conquer or to impose a new government. It was emphasized that the three powers merely wanted to open negotiations regarding their claims of damages.

On January 14, 1862, a bill of claims was presented to the government in Mexico City. Foreign Minister Manuel Doblado invited the commissioners to travel to Orizaba with two thousand of their own troops for a conference while requesting that the rest of the tripartite forces disembark from Veracruz. The proposal to disembark most of the troops was rejected, but negotiations then resulted in an agreement, ratified on January 23, to move the forces inland and hold a conference at Orizaba. The agreement also officially recognized the government of Juarez along with Mexican sovereignty.

=== The French invasion begins ===
On April 9, 1862, agreements at Orizaba between the allies broke down, as France made it increasingly clear that it intended to invade Mexico and interfere in its government in violation of previous treaties. The British informed the Mexican government that they now intended to exit the country, and an arrangement was made with the British government to settle its claims. Minister Doblado on April 11 made it known to the French government that its intentions would lead to war.

Certain Mexican officers had been sympathetic to the French since the beginning of the intervention. On April 16, 1862, the French issued a proclamation inviting Mexicans to join them in establishing a new government. On April 17, 1862, Mexican general Juan Almonte, who had been a foreign minister of the conservative government during the Reform War, and who was brought back to Mexico by the French, released his own manifesto, assuring the Mexican people of benevolent French intentions.

The French defeated a small Mexican force at Escamela, and then captured Orizaba. Mexican Generals Porfirio Diaz and Ignacio Zaragoza retreated to El Ingenio, and then headed towards Puebla.

General Charles de Lorencez led 6,000 French troops to attack Puebla de Los Angeles in May 1862, certain that the French would win the war in Mexico quickly. Juarez assembled a ragged group of faithful soldiers at his new base of operations in the north and dispatched them to Puebla. Britain and Spain bargained with Mexico before withdrawing, but Napoleon III's France opted to take advantage of the available space to create an empire based on Mexico. A well-armed French warship invaded Veracruz late in 1861, landing a sizable French army and forcing President Juarez and his administration into exile.

Almonte now attempted to consolidate the Mexican pro-French movement. The town of Orizaba joined him and so did the port of Veracruz and Isla del Carmen. Colonel Gonzales, Manuel Castellanos, Desiderio Samaniego, Padre Miranda, and Haro Tamariz, and General Antonio Taboada arrived in Orizaba to support Almonte. On April 28, 1862, French forces headed towards Puebla.

== Prelude ==
On May 2, the French Army and the Mexican troops under Antonio Taboada reached Amozoc, and on the 4th pitched their camp within the sight of Puebla. Lorencez intended on immediately taking the forts of Loreto and Guadalupe, whose possession would assure him control of the city. Juan Almonte and Antonio de Haro y Tamariz had advised Lorencez to attack an orchard of the Convento del Carmen opposite the fortified heights of Guadalupe and Loreto, which was not done. They had also previously advised Lorencez to simply bypass Puebla and march on to the capital. Mexican historian Francisco Bulnes remarked that Lorencez lacked the men to starve out the city, lacked the artillery to take it by intimidation, lacked the men and artillery to take it by gradual assaults, and could only attempt to storm it in a risky manner that could have scarcely hoped to succeed.

The Mexican Republican Army arrived in Puebla on May 3. On the 4th Arteaga's division now under the command of General Miguel Negrete, occupied the Guadalupe and Loreto Forts. The remainder of the forces took up quarters in the city.

== Battle ==
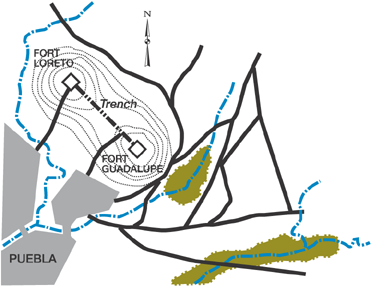
Map of the battle terrain

At half past eleven Lorencez arranged an attack column made up of two battalions of zouaves, one battery commanded by Captain Bernard, and four pieces of Captain Mallat's marine artillery. The regiment of marine infantry and marine riflemen formed the reserve along with a mountain gun. They were meant to protect the rear of the attack columns, which was threatened by the Mexican cavalry on the right. To contain a Mexican force which was threatening the left, he charged L'Heriller to protect with four battalions of marine infantry the convoy which he placed at a convenient location. Cavalry was assigned to place itself between the convoy and the attack columns, which now awaited orders to attack.

The two battalions of zouaves now set their backpacks on the foot of the hill and began their ascent marching in columns by division and between them carrying ten pieces of horse artillery. They headed to their right towards the Fort of Guadalupe. According to a report telegraphed by General Zaragoza to the central government, the fighting broke out at noon. The strategy of attacking the most difficult, fortified, and heavily armed point caught the attention of General Zaragoza, as it now seemed that the French had tossed aside the military maxim of achieving a victory with the least amount of losses possible in favor of bravado. Zaragoza upon noticing that the attack was going to come via a direct assault on the forts, and who had a large body of this troops on standby for attack now changed his strategy. He gave orders for the forts of Loreto and Guadalupe to be reinforced. The French division advanced and when opposite the Guadalupe fort, halted and planted its artillery to fire upon the Guadalupe and the Loreto forts. After shelling them for two hours, a strong column preceded by sharpshooters advanced upon Fort Guadalupe by the northern side. Felipe Berriozábal was then ordered to reinforce the two hills. A portion of the cavalry was divided into two bodies, one of which was placed under Colonel Alvarez and the other under Colonel Trujano. The rest were to be commanded by Colonel Felix Diaz.

The French army's weaponry was advanced compared to Mexico's at the time of the battle. French soldiers were equipped with long rifles that could easily outgun the Mexicans' antiquated muskets when they arrived at Puebla on May 4. At the onset of battle, French soldiers underestimated the defensive capacity of the Mexican positions, to the point that many didn't bother to properly assemble their weaponry. The French attempted to intimidate the civilian population on the morning of May 5 with loud bugle cries and complex bayonet drills. They were forced to retire, however, as a result of significant casualties, following a full day of warfare that included three miserably failed uphill attacks.

The French in their ascent towards Fort Guadalupe experienced little opposition and only a few casualties from the fort's guns. They had completed half of the ascent when they were met by two battalions of Mexican infantry, which after exchanging shots with French sharpshooters, returned to their position. The French troops continued their ascent while Mexican cavalry under the cover of a maguey field remained still. The Mexican infantry also under the same cover kept firing upon the French. The ascending column now turned diagonally towards the right, as if going between the two forts, and the two forts now took advantage of the opportunity to fire upon the French troops. Finding themselves assailed from all quarters by infantry and cavalry, the French retreated and were pursued by Mexican forces, but the pursuit was given up when another French column came to the support of the retreating troops.

The two French columns now pushed on together towards the Guadalupe and Resurrection chapel. The two columns combined and split into three. This second attack on the east and the north of the city was much more vigorous. The two columns which attempted an assault on the hill from the north again were completely routed. General Diaz with portions of his brigade and other troops and two pieces of artillery checked and drove away the French columns which were marching against the Mexican positions. The third French column which reached the east side just as the others were repulsed was also defeated. The Mexican cavalry then charged upon the remaining French and prevented their reorganization for further assaults.

The French and the Mexicans continue to face each other until seven in the evening when the French returned to their camp at Los Alamos and then to Orizaba on the 8th to await reinforcements which were on their way from France.

== Aftermath ==
The Battle of Puebla was an inspirational event for Mexico during the war, and it proved a stunning revelation to the rest of the world which had largely expected a rapid victory for French arms. The victory filled the government of Benito Juarez with high hopes. Zaragoza received the thanks of congress, and was awarded a sword. The city name of Puebla de los Ángeles was changed to Puebla de Zaragoza. Honors and rewards were decreed to the officers and men who took part in the action. Zaragoza sent the government the medals and decorations taken on the battlefield as well of those from prisoners, but President Juarez returned them along with the French prisoners of war. General Zaragoza did not live long after the victory as he died four months later due to typhoid fever. A decree issued by Benito Juárez established the major annual event cinco de mayo.

Despite already having some collaborators, the French attributed their defeat at Puebla to a wider lack of Conservative Party support. Only two days after the battle the Mexican General Taboada who had collaborated with the French during the battle wrote to his liberal friend, Tomás O'Horán, inviting him to join the French, arguing that they wished to establish a stable government and would bring order to the country. O'Horan would reject the offer, even fighting against the ultimately triumphant Siege of Puebla that the French carried out the following year, but O'Horan eventually defected to join the forces of the Second Mexican Empire.

Slowed by their loss at Puebla, the French forces retreated and regrouped, and the invasion continued after Napoleon III determinedly sent additional troops to Mexico and dismissed General Lorencez. The French were eventually victorious, winning the Second Battle of Puebla on 17 May 1863 and pushing on to Mexico City. When the capital fell, Juárez's government was forced into exile in the remote northern parts of Mexico.

With the backing of France, the Second Empire of Mexico was established, with the Habsburg Archduke Maximilian as Emperor of Mexico.

General Porfirio Diaz, who had played a notable role during the battle, continued to distinguish himself as one of the most important liberal commanders throughout the Second French intervention, and even escaped after being captured by the French. After the end of the Intervention and the fall of the Empire, he attempted to overthrow the government of Benito Juarez before eventually becoming the President of Mexico in 1876.

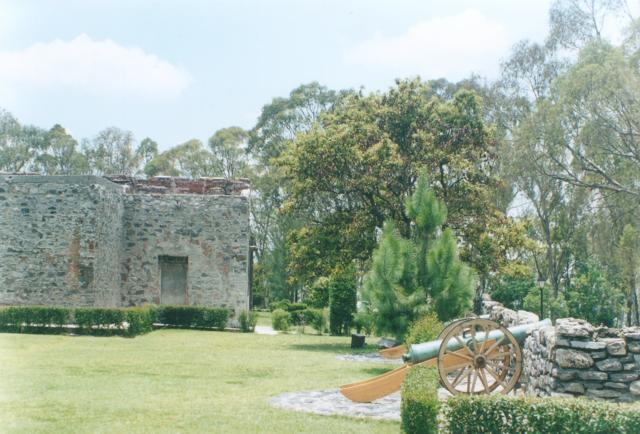
An image of Fort Guadalupe

The political decision taken by President Franklin D. Roosevelt to implement the "Good Neighbor Policy," which was intended to promote links with Latin American nations and people, was one of the key factors in the popularization of "Cinco de Mayo" in the United States. As a result of the Roosevelt administration's promotion of the holiday, Cinco de Mayo gained popularity in the 1950s and 1960s and eventually became a recognized national holiday. While the original celebrations in the United States were localized among Mexican immigrants from the state of Puebla commemorating the battle, over time, the origins of the holiday have become less emphasized and the date has evolved into a general celebration of Mexican culture by immigrants and their descendants from all parts of Mexico. A comparable phenomenon can be found in the evolution of St. Patrick's Day from an ecclesiastical holiday marking the arrival of Christianity in Ireland to a largely secularized celebration of Irish American culture.

== Celebration ==
On 9 May 1862, President Juárez declared that the anniversary of the Battle of Puebla would be a national holiday, regarded as "Battle of Puebla Day" or "Battle of Cinco de Mayo".

Cinco de Mayo is not the national day of Mexico, as is often believed in the US. The most important national patriotic holiday in Mexico is Independence Day, on 16 September, commemorating the 1810 "Cry of Dolores" call-to-arms, that began the War of Independence. Mexico also observes the culmination of the war of Independence, which lasted 11 years, on 27 September.

Cinco de Mayo is a day of celebration for the Hispanics and is a tradition that takes place on May 5 to mark the date that Mexico defeated the Second French Empire in the Battle of Puebla in 1862, under the command of General Ignacio Zaragoza, a Texas native. The Mexicans' morale was boosted by their win over the bigger and better armed French army with a smaller, less well-equipped Mexican force, which included 500 other Tejanos.

Since the 1930s, a re-enactment of the Battle of Puebla has been held each year at Peñón de los Baños, a rocky outcrop close to Mexico City International Airport.

== See also ==
- List of battles of the French intervention in Mexico
- Monument for the 150th Anniversary of the Battle of Puebla
