= Marcus Otterbourg =

German-born Jewish-American journalist, diplomat, and judge (1827–1893)

Marcus Otterbourg (March 11, 1827 – December 7, 1893) was a German-born Jewish-American journalist, diplomat, lawyer, and judge. He was the first Jewish-American Minister to a foreign country.

== Life ==
Otterbourg was born on March 11, 1827, in Landau, Bavaria. He moved to Paris, France, when he was thirteen and lived with his brother, the medical doctor Solomon Otterbourg. His parents were Jonas and Fanny Otterbourg.

Otterbourg received his education in Paris. He worked as a teacher in England for some time. He then moved to Mannheim, Baden, where he worked as a teacher of French and English. Marked a Revolutionist, he immigrated to America in 1852. He then moved to Milwaukee, Wisconsin, where he initially conducted a vinegar distillery. He then became a reporter of the Wisconsin Legislature and developed an interest in politics. In 1860, he was Postmaster of the Wisconsin State Assembly.

During that time, Otterbourg befriended fellow German immigrant Carl Schurz, and together they became active in the new Republican Party and met a number of prominent western figures, including Abraham Lincoln. Following Lincoln's election as President, Otterbourg went to Washington, D.C., as a news correspondent. In August 1861, he was appointed Consul of Mexico City, Mexico. He served in that position throughout the American Civil War and the Second French intervention in Mexico. When the American Minister to Mexico Thomas Corwin returned to America in 1864, Otterbourg was left in charge of the Legation until a new minister could come to Mexico. In April 1865, he returned to America and resigned from his position. The resignation was not accepted and he went back to Mexico. He again attempted to resign in the summer of 1866 as his wife and children were back in America and couldn't afford to live on his consular salary. In October 1866, he heard critical information on the desperate state of the French in Mexico and left Mexico without leave to deliver the news to Secretary of State William H. Seward in person.

Seward ordered Otterbourg to accompany Lewis D. Campbell, the new Minister to Mexico, and General Ulysses S. Grant to Mexico to help establish peace in Mexico. When Grant refused to join the planned expedition, General William Tecumseh Sherman was selected instead. Campbell only went as far as Cuba, and in November 1866 Ottenbourg went to Mexico without the two men. By then, the French were withdrawing from Mexico. He worked on solving the forced loans issue, sought to aid American and European residents in Mexico City (especially when European diplomats fled the city), and unsuccessfully tried to save Emperor Maximilian's life, although as he was only Consul he had little authority. When Campbell returned to the United States Ottenbourg began petitioning Seward to name him Minister so he could better serve America's interests. He served as Chargé d'Affaires ad interim from April 1866 to August 1867.

In June 1867, following the Siege of Mexico City, Otterbourg was appointed the United States Minister to Mexico. Edward L. Plumb, the Secretary of Legation and acting chargé d'affaires, wrote a letter to Seward opposing the nomination based on the false accusation Ottenbourg was in the pay of the French. He helped establish relations with the new Mexican Republic, and when General Porfirio Díaz gave a banquet in honor of the new Mexican President Benito Juárez he was the only foreign agent invited. By then worn out from his many years in Mexico, he left Mexico and his position as Minister in September 1867. He had only served as Minister for a few months and was never confirmed Minister by the Senate. He was the first Jewish-American to be appointed Minister to any foreign country.

Following his return to the United States, Otterbourg moved to New York City, New York, and became active in local politics. He was admitted to the bar in 1871, after which practiced law with Maunsell B. Field. Benjamin F. Russell later joined the law firm. In 1873, Mayor William Frederick Havemeyer appointed him Police Justice with the encouragement of Alderman Oswald Ottendorfer. A political independent and active Tammany Hall opponent, he ran for Justice of the City Court in 1878 as the candidate for the German-American Independent Citizens' Union. He served as president of the board of Police Justices in 1881. When his term as Police Justice expired in 1882, he wasn't reappointed for political reasons. He returned to practicing law in 1883 and formed a partnership with his son Eugene.

Otterbourg married Mathilde Bruno shortly after immigrating to America. They had one son, Eugene. Mathilde died a few years into their marriage. In 1858, he married Augusta Stroheimer. Their children were George, Matilda, Marx, and Carl.

Otterbourg died in his home from pneumonia on December 7, 1893. His funeral was held at the Liederkranz club house and the eulogy was delivered by Commissioner of Immigration Joseph H. Senner. He was buried in Woodlawn Cemetery.

Diplomatic posts
Preceded by John Black	United States Consul in Mexico City; 1861–1867	Succeeded by Julius A. Skilton
Preceded by Lewis D. Campbell	United States Minister to Mexico; 1867	Succeeded by William Rosecrans
