= Monument for the 150th Anniversary of the Battle of Puebla =

Monument and park in Puebla, Mexico

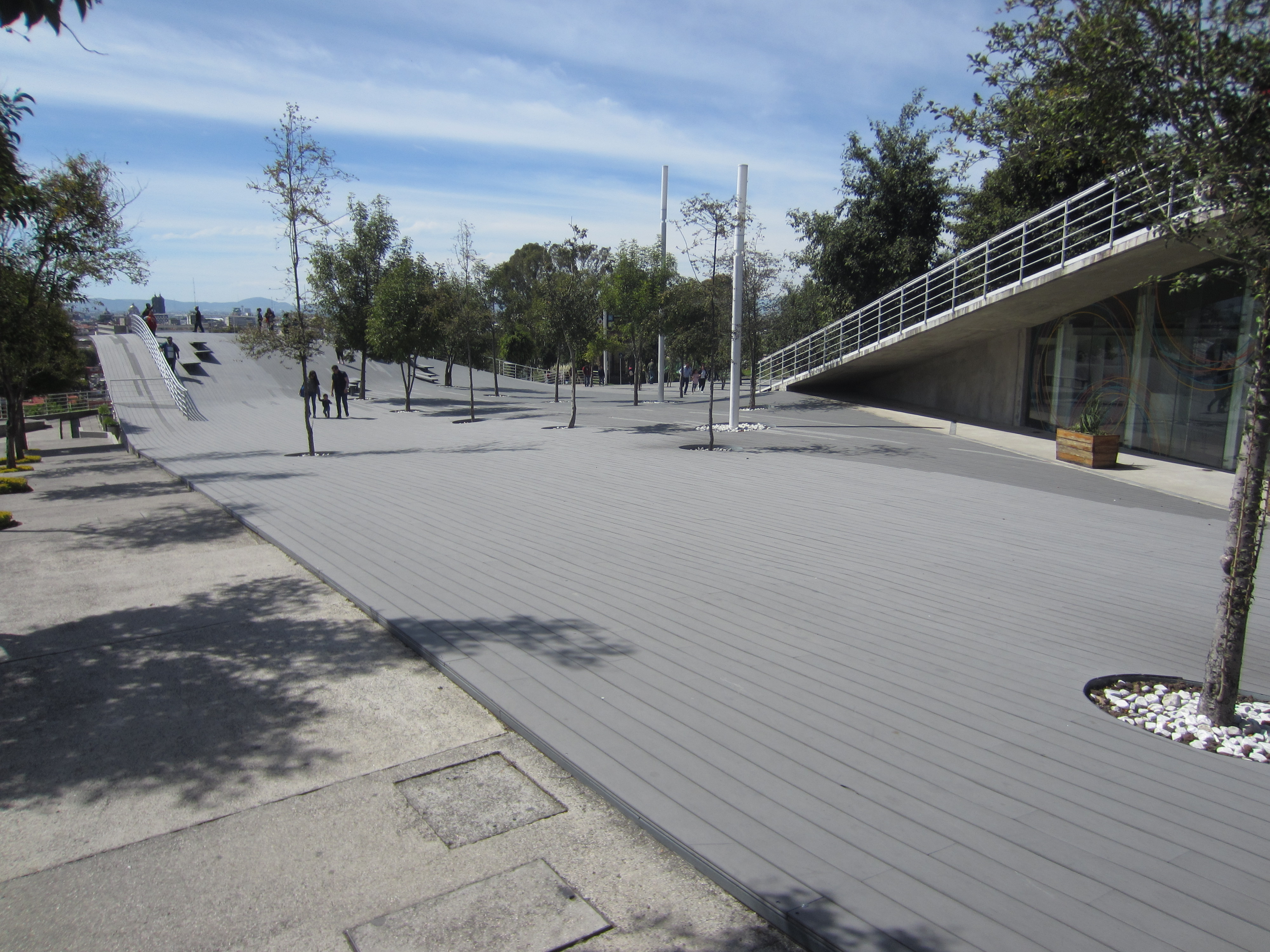
- Part of the park in 2018
- Interactive map of Monument for the 150th Anniversary of the Battle of Puebla
- Type: Public park and memorial
- Nearest city: Puebla, Puebla, Mexico
- Coordinates: 19°3′23″N 98°11′17″W
- Created: 2011-12

The Monument for the 150th Anniversary of the Battle of Puebla is a public park and memorial designed by Enrique Norten of TEN Arquitectos, located in the city of Puebla, Puebla, Mexico. The project was completed during 2011–2012, and commemorates the 150th anniversary of the Battle of Puebla.

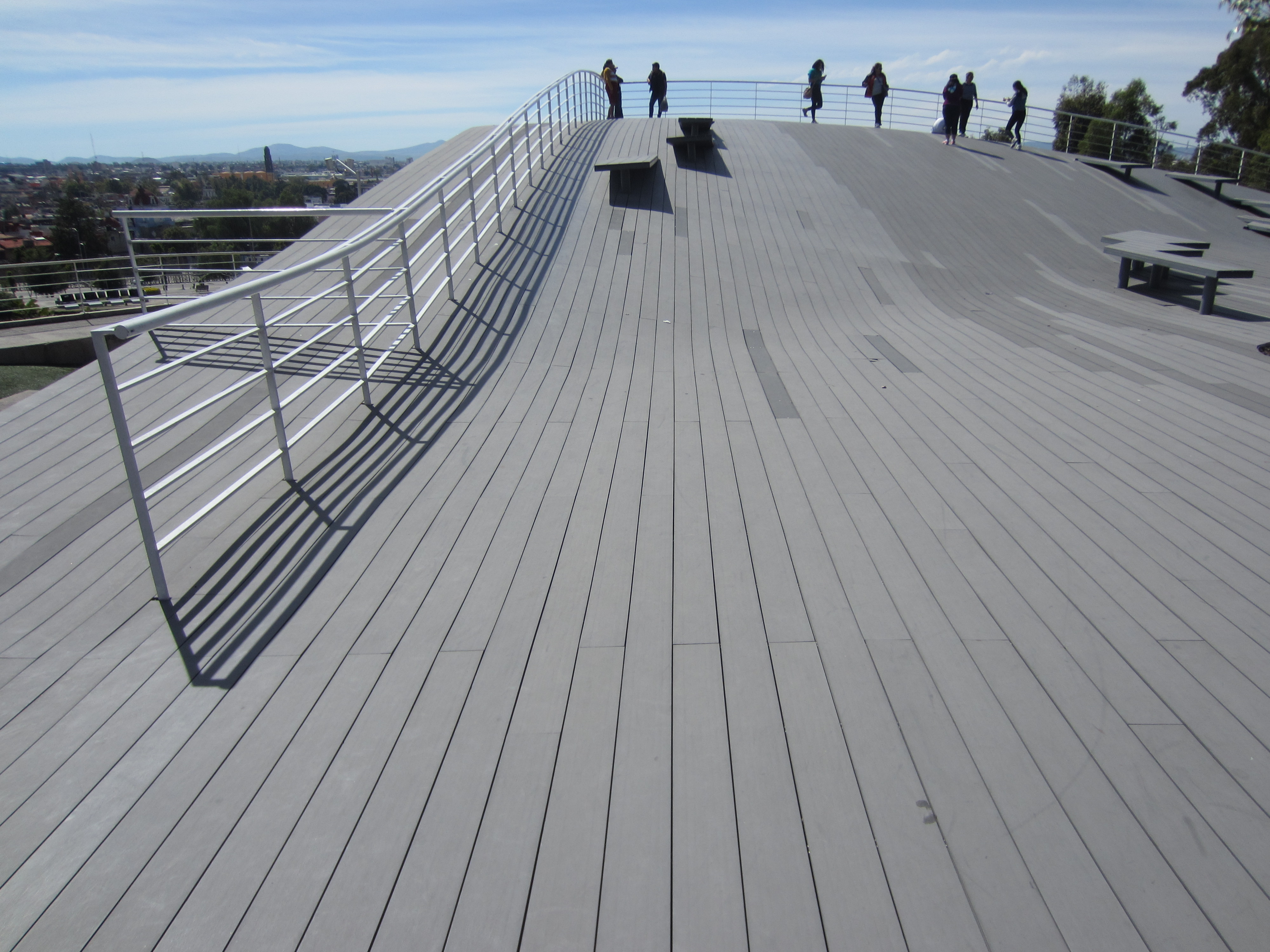

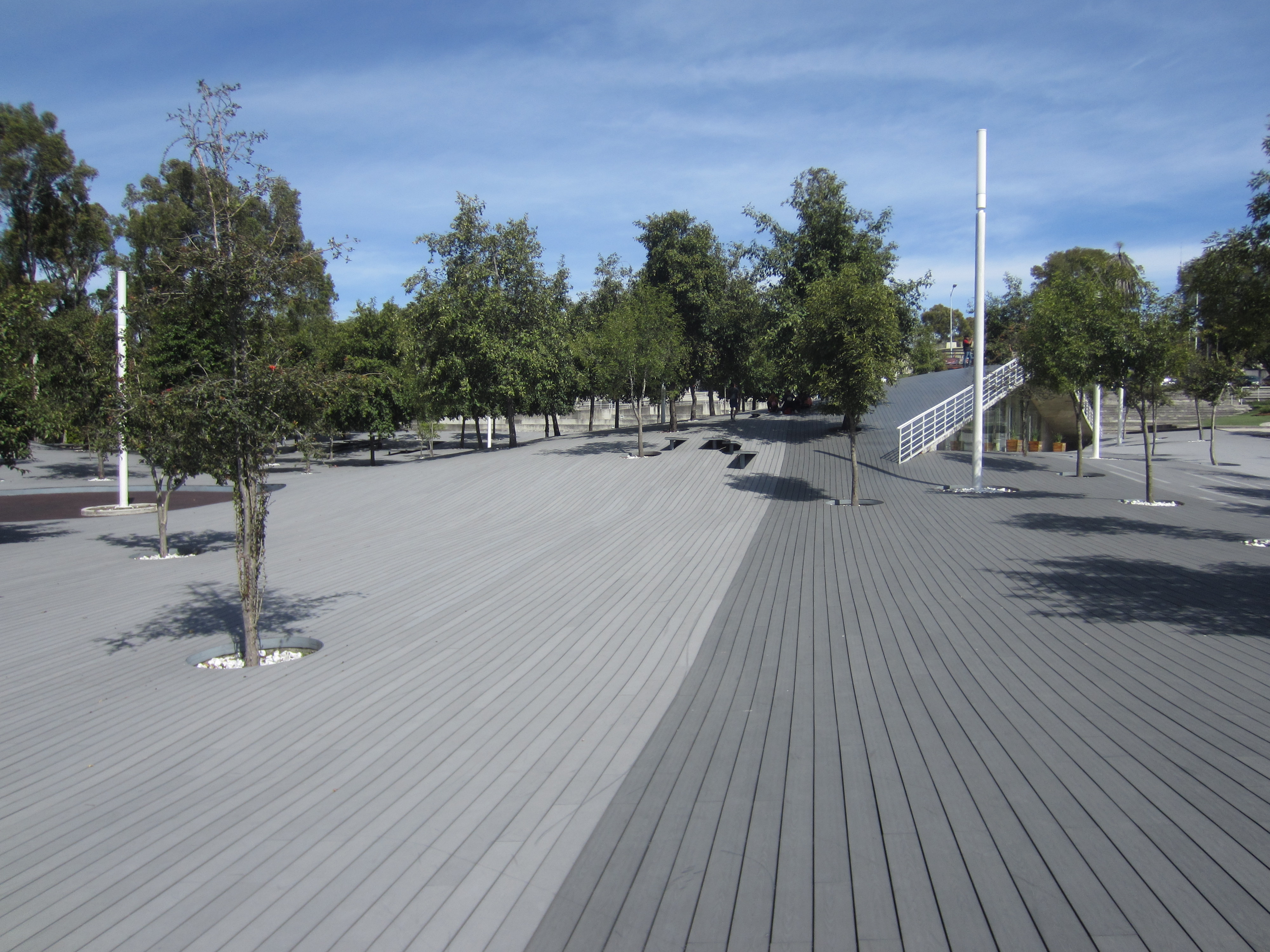
