= Mexican Federal Highway 203 =

Highway in Mexico

Federal Highway 203
- Carretera federal 203

Route information
- Maintained by Secretariat of Infrastructure, Communications and Transportation
- Length: 75.3 km (46.8 mi)

Major junctions
- North end: Fed. 186 in El Suspiro, Chiapas
- South end: Tenosique, Tabasco

Location
- Country: Mexico

Highway system
- Mexican Federal Highways; List; Autopistas
← Fed. 200	→ Fed. 211

Federal Highway 203 (Carretera Federal 203) is a Federal Highway of Mexico. The highway travels from El Suspiro, Chiapas near Emiliano Zapata, Tabasco in the northwest to Tenosique, Tabasco in the southeast.
