= Mexican Federal Highway 188 =

Highway in Mexico

Federal Highway 188
- Carretera federal 188

Route information
- Maintained by Secretariat of Infrastructure, Communications and Transportation
- Length: 79 km (49 mi)

Major junctions
- East end: Fed. 261 in San Antonio Cayal
- West end: Fed. 180 in Haltunchén

Location
- Country: Mexico
- State: Campeche

Highway system
- Mexican Federal Highways; List; Autopistas
← Fed. 187	→ Fed. 190

Federal Highway 188 (Carretera Federal 188) is a Federal Highway of Mexico. The highway travels from San Antonio Cayal, Campeche in the northeast to Haltunchén, Campeche in the southwest.
