= Juan R. Escudero (municipality) =

Municipality in Guerrero, Mexico

- Municipality
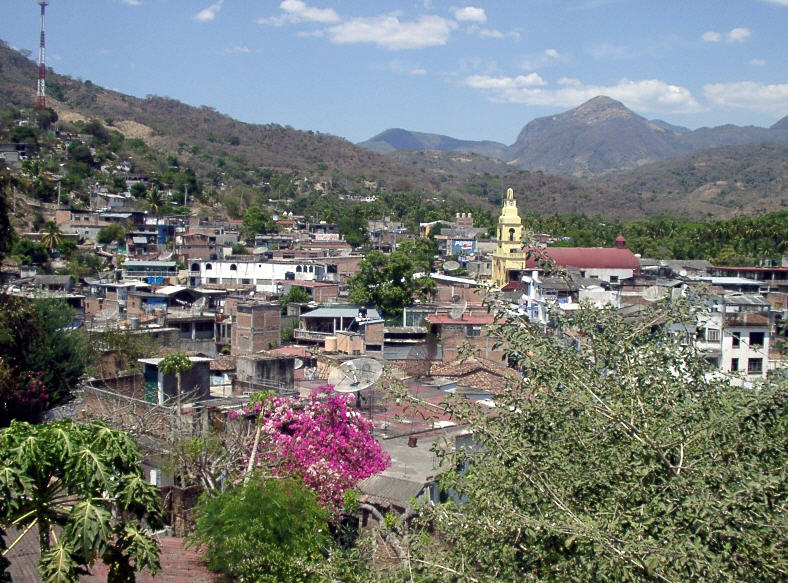
- The municipal seat of Tierra Colorada

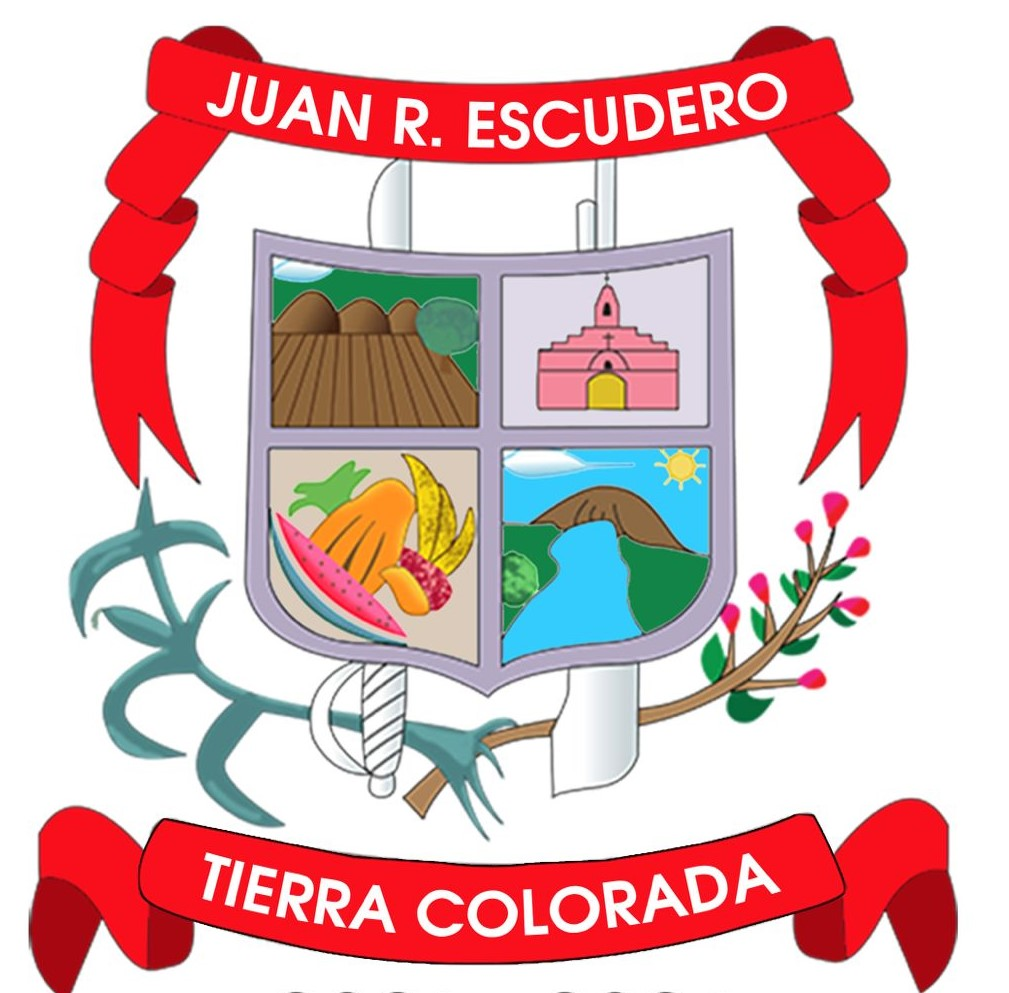
- Coat of arms

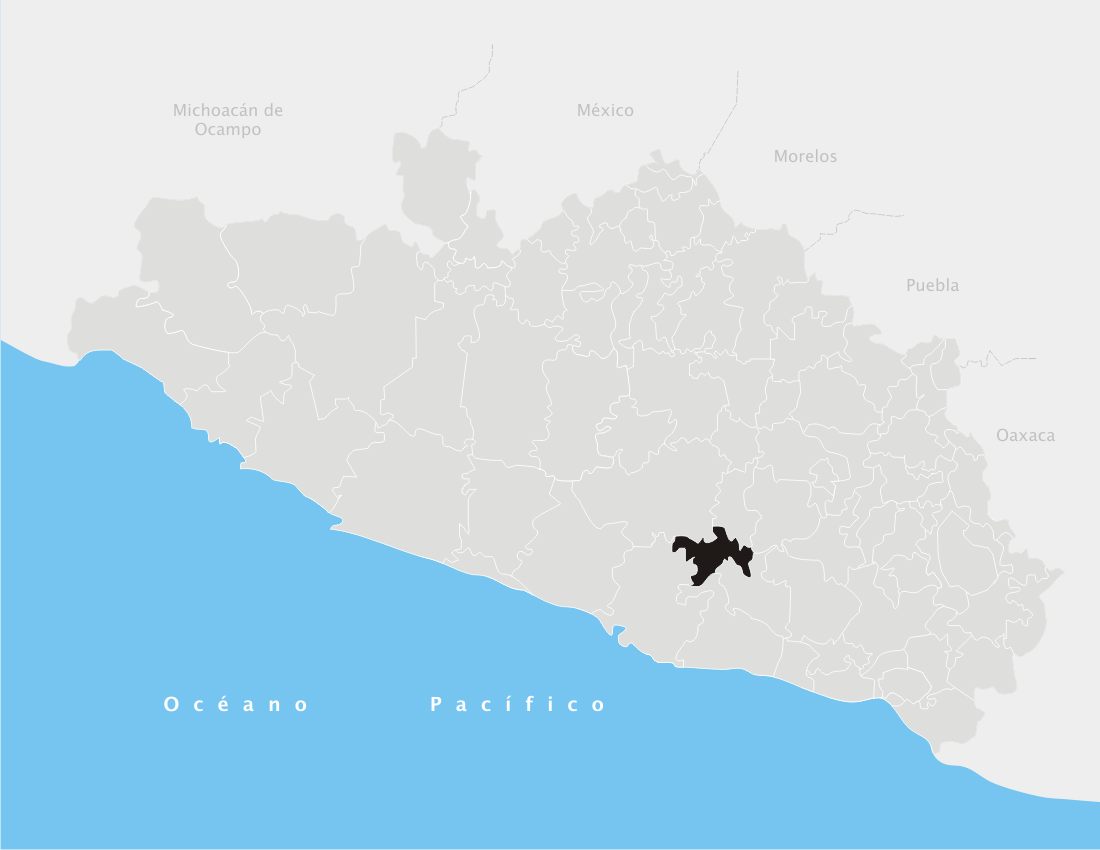
- Municipality of Juan R. Escudero in Guerrero

- Location in Mexico
- Coordinates: 17°41′N 98°26′W
- Country: Mexico
- State: Guerrero
- Municipal seat: Tierra Colorada

Government
  - Municipal President: Porfirio Muñoz Leyva (PRD)

Area
  - Total: 652.6 km^{2} (252.0 sq mi)

Population (2005)
  - Total: 22,805

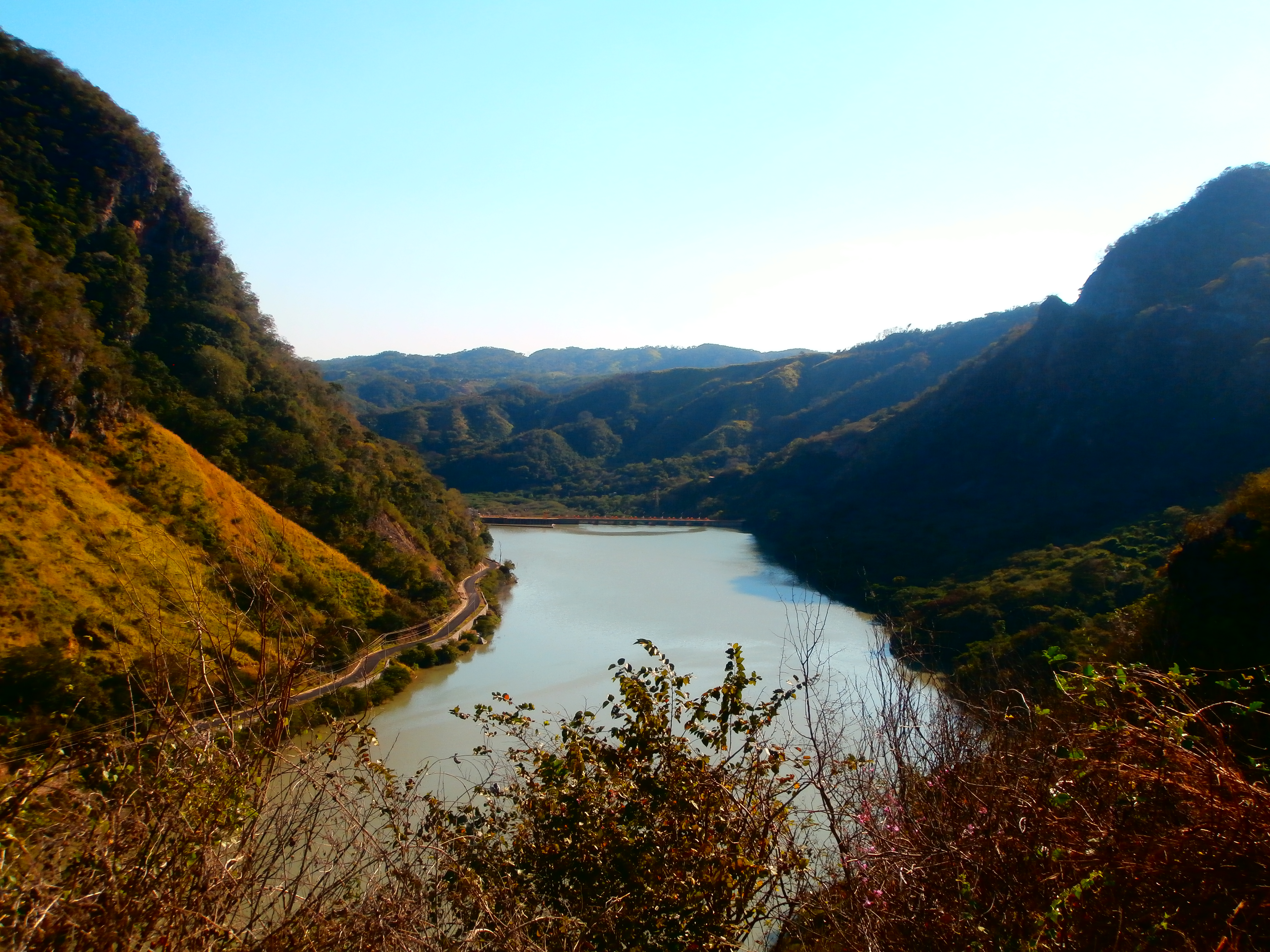
General Ambrosio Figueroa (La Venta) dam.

Juan R. Escudero is a municipality in the Mexican state of Guerrero. Its principal settlement is Tierra Colorada. The municipality covers an area of 652.6 km^{2} (252.0 sq mi).

As of 2005, the municipality had a total population of 22,805.

== Geography ==
=== Towns and villages ===
In 2005, the INEGI registered 33 localities in Juan R. Escudero. The largest are as follows:

Locality	Population
Total Municipio	22,805
Tierra Colorada	10,502
La Palma	1,579
San Juan del Reparo Sur	1,059
El Terrero	5,000
Chacalapa de Bravos	902
San Juan del Reparo	869

== Administration ==
=== Municipal presidents ===
Municipal president	Period
Juvencio Espíritu Ramírez	(1969–1971)
Andrés Morales Santiago	(1972–1974)
Celestino Vela García	(1975–1977)
	(1978–1980)
	(1981–1983)
Rogelio Álvarez González	(1984–1986)
Arquímedes Meza García	(1987–1989)
Marcelino Arizmendi Flores	(1990–1993)
Alejandro Sánchez Rodríguez	(1993–1996)
José Jacobo Valle	(1996–1999)
Antelmo Bello Hernández	(1999–2002)
Ismael Pablo Avila Ramírez	(2002–2005)
Héctor Vela Carbajal	(2005–2008)
