= Tomás O'Horán y Escudero =

Mexican general (1819-1867)

Tomás O'Horán
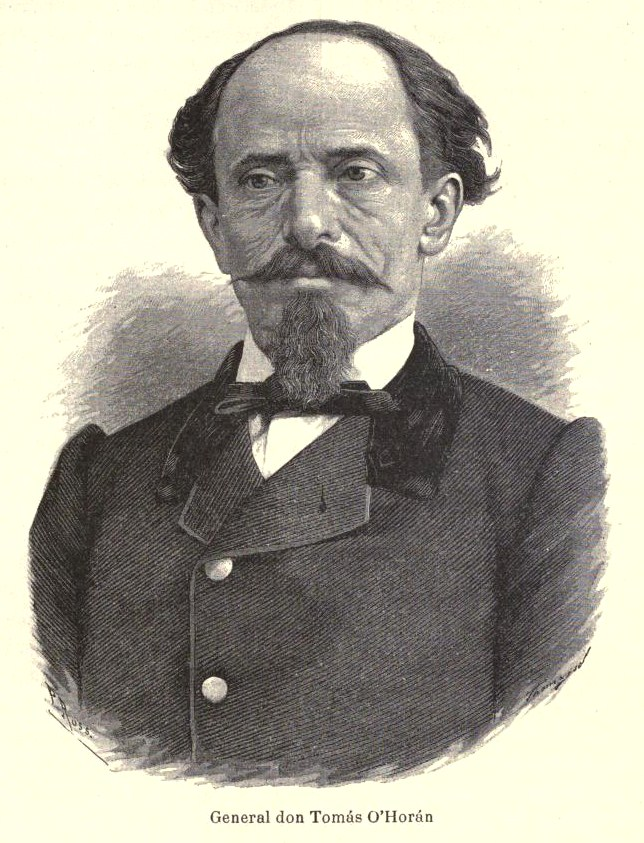

Governor of the State of Mexico
- In office 1862–1862
- President: Benito Juárez
- Preceded by: Pascual González Fuentes
- Succeeded by: Francisco Ortiz de Zárate

Mayor of Mexico City
- In office September 30, 1866 – June 14, 1867
- Monarch: Maximilian I of Mexico
- Preceded by: Mariano Icaza
- Succeeded by: Porfirio Díaz

Personal details
- Born: January 11, 1819 Guatemala City, Captaincy General of Guatemala, Viceroyalty of New Spain
- Died: August 21, 1867 (aged 48) Mexico City, Mexico

Military service
- Allegiance: Centralist Republic of Mexico; Second Federal Republic of Mexico; Second Mexican Empire
- Branch: Mexican Army; Imperial Mexican Army
- Years of service: 1836 – 1867
- Rank: General
- Battles/wars: Texas Revolution; Pastry War; Mexican–American War; Northern Mexican Theater; Battle of Buena Vista; Reform War; Second Franco-Mexican War; Battle of Puebla; Siege of Puebla; Siege of Mexico City (executed)

Tomás Antonio Ignacio O'Horán y Escudero (1819–1867) was an Imperial Mexican general of Irish descent during the Second French intervention in Mexico. He was known for switching sides during the war as he initially sided with Benito Juárez but after the Siege of Mexico City, O'Horán was executed.

== Early military career ==
He was the son of Tomas O'Horan who was a prominent politician from Yucatan and the brother to Agustín O'Horán, a doctor who would gain fame in Mexico. He began his military career as a cadet in 1836 as he was within Antonio López de Santa Anna's army to quell the Texas Revolution. He also participated in the Pastry War and was stationed in Yucatán as a second lieutenant to oppose Santiago Imán the following year. During the Mexican–American War, O'Horán participated in the Battle of Buena Vista. Similarly during the Reform War, he sided with the Benito Juárez and the liberal faction of the war.

== Second French intervention ==
Due to his previous affiliation with Juárez, O'Horán again sided with Juárez against the French Empire and the Mexican imperialists. Initially given the nickname "the Immortal of Atlixco", he managed to repel Imperial Mexican forces along with General Antonio Carvajal which played a significant role in the Republican victory during the Battle of Puebla. During the battle, his liberal friend Antonio Taboada asked O'Horán if he would like to switch sides, claiming that if he did so, that Mexico would be brought to stability but he declined at the moment. Later on at the Siege of Puebla, O'Horán launched a raid through the French siege lines to deliver goods to the Republicans which helped to prolong the siege. Due to his military accomplishments, Juárez made O'Horán the military governor of Morelia and later, Governor of the State of Mexico. However, after the Republican forces evacuated Central Mexico and in a difficult employment position, O'Horán defected to the Imperial Mexican Army and managed to quell the unrest at Tlalpan.

O'Horán was then made Mayor of Mexico City when Juárez's forces began to lay siege at Mexico City. Despite putting up resistance, O'Horán was forced to flee the city but while fleeing, was apprehended and sentenced to death for treason. General Porfirio Díaz requested Juárez to pardon O'Horán due to his previous service but Juárez was adamant on the execution of O'Horán. He then wrote a manifesto, claiming that he simply wanted to bring order to Mexico, never intended to back the interests of foreign powers and did not deserve death for a political error due to his prior service in serving the country. Nonetheless, O'Horán was executed by firing squad on August 21, 1867.
