= Mexican Federal Highway 187 =

Highway in Mexico

Federal Highway 187
- Carretera federal 187

Route information
- Maintained by Secretariat of Infrastructure, Communications and Transportation
- Length: 185.47 km (115.25 mi)

Major junctions
- North end: El Bellote
- South end: Fed. 187D in Raudales Malpaso

Location
- Country: Mexico

Highway system
- Mexican Federal Highways; List; Autopistas
← Fed. 186	→ Fed. 188

Federal Highway 187 (Carretera Federal 187) is a Federal Highway of Mexico. The highway travels from El Bellote, Centla Municipality, Tabasco in the north to Raudales Malpaso, Tecpatán Municipality, Chiapas in the south. Federal Highway 187 is one of two major north-south highway corridors in Tabasco (the other being Federal Highway 180 and 195 corridor). Federal Highway 187 route numbering continues as the Federal Highway 187D toll road from Raudales Malpaso south to Mexican Federal Highway 190 east of Ocozocoautla de Espinosa.
