= Mexican Federal Highway 196 =

Highway in Mexico

Federal Highway 196
- Carretera federal 196

Route information
- Maintained by Secretariat of Communications and Transportation
- Length: 26.3 km (16.3 mi)

Major junctions
- East end: Fed. 95 in Chilpancingo
- West end: Chichihualco

Location
- Country: Mexico
- State: Guerrero

Highway system
- Mexican Federal Highways; List; Autopistas
← Fed. 195	→ Fed. 198

Federal Highway 196 (Carretera Federal 196) is a Federal Highway of Mexico. The highway is a spur route that connects Chichihualco, Guerrero and Mexican Federal Highway 95 in the southeast.
