= Mexican Federal Highway 107 =

Highway in Mexico

Federal Highway 107
- Carretera federal 107

Route information
- Maintained by Secretariat of Communications and Transportation
- Length: 58 km (36 mi)

Major junctions
- North end: Fed. 101 in Jiménez, Tamaulipas
- South end: Fed. 180 north of Soto la Marina

Location
- Country: Mexico
- State: Tamaulipas

Highway system
- Mexican Federal Highways; List; Autopistas
← Fed. 106	→ Fed. 110

Federal Highway 107 (Carretera Federal 107) is a Federal Highway of Mexico. The highway travels from Mexican Federal Highway 101 at Jiménez, Tamaulipas in the north to Mexican Federal Highway 180 north of Soto la Marina, Tamaulipas in the south. Federal Highway 107 is co-signed with Tamaulipas Highway 38.
