= Mexican Federal Highway 187D =

Toll highway in Mexico

Federal Highway 187D
- Carretera federal 187D
- Autopista Las Choapas-Ocozocuautla

Route information
- Maintained by Caminos y Puentes Federales
- Length: 197.5 km (122.7 mi)

Major junctions
- West end: Fed. 180 northwest of Las Choapas, Veracruz
- East end: Fed. 190 at Ocozocuautla, Chiapas

Location
- Country: Mexico

Highway system
- Mexican Federal Highways; List; Autopistas

Federal Highway 187D is a toll highway connecting Las Choapas, Veracruz to Ocozocuautla, Chiapas. The road is operated by Caminos y Puentes Federales, which charges 195 pesos for the entire course of route.

While the road is officially Highway 187D, it is signed as Federal Highway 145D, reflecting the indirect connection that can be made from the highway's northern terminus to the federal highway that leads through southern and central Veracruz to Mexico City.

== Route description ==
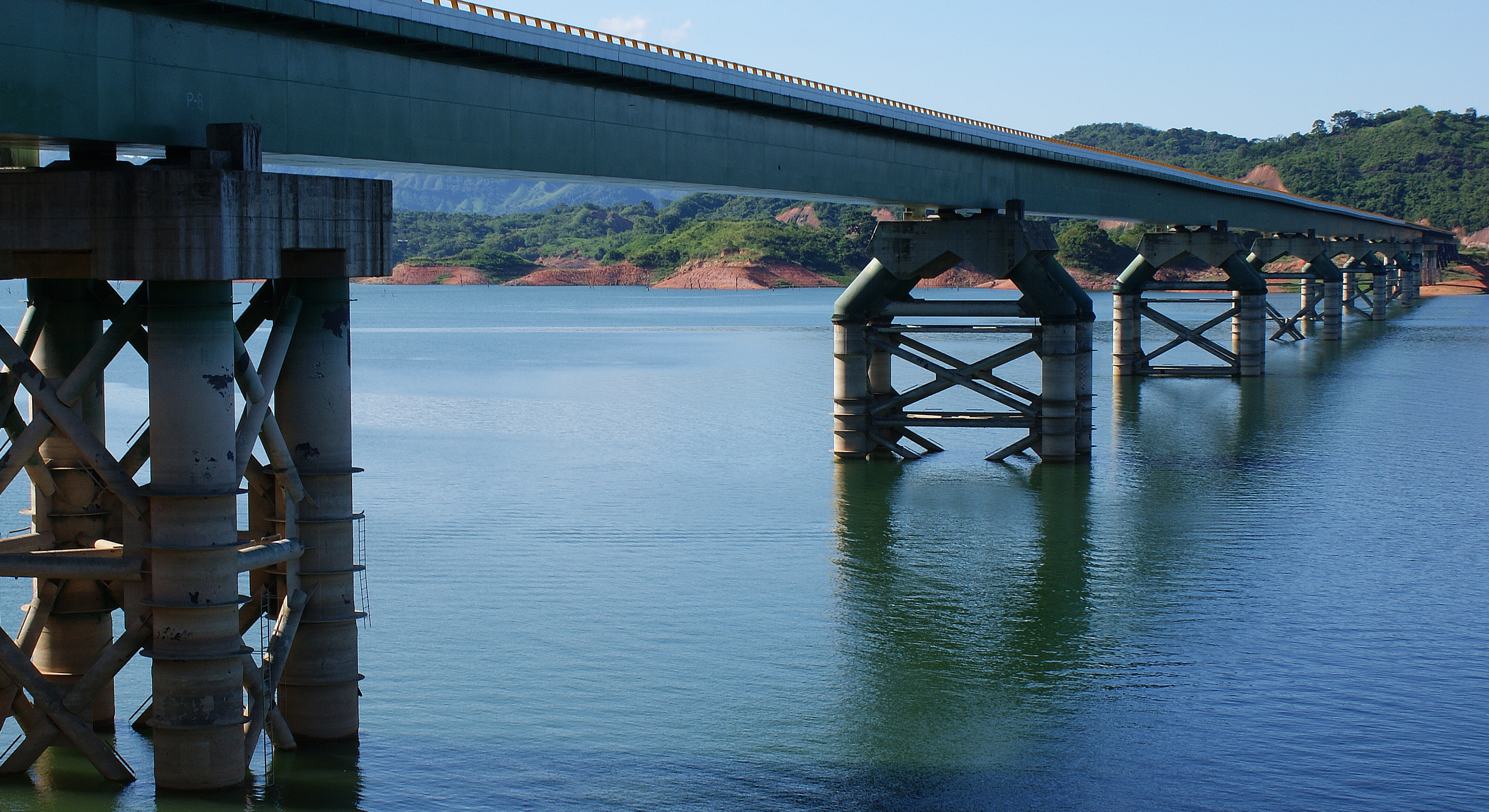
The Chiapas Bridge

Highway 187D begins at Highway 180 halfway between Las Choapas and Coatzacoalcos. In Veracruz, exits provide service to Las Choapas and Nuevo Sacrificio. 80 kilometres (50 mi) after passing the first toll plaza at Las Choapas, the road briefly enters the state of Tabasco, where it has one exit, at Malpasito, and a toll plaza. Highway 187D then crosses into Chiapas, with interchanges at Mexico Federal Highway 187 and a road to Raudales Malpaso, and it traverses the 1,208-metre (3,963 ft) Chiapas Bridge, which spans the Malpaso Dam.

After the bridge, Highway 187D proceeds southeast, with interchanges at Apic-Pac and Ocuilapa de Juárez, as well as one final toll plaza before it transitions into Highway 190 between Ocozocuautla and Tuxtla Gutiérrez.
