= Mexican Federal Highway 102 =

Highway in Mexico

Federal Highway 102
- Carretera federal 102

Route information
- Maintained by Secretariat of Infrastructure, Communications and Transportation
- Length: 137.1 km (85.2 mi)

Major junctions
- East end: Fed. 127 in Álamo, Veracruz
- West end: Fed. 85 in Tamazunchale, San Luis Potosí

Location
- Country: Mexico

Highway system
- Mexican Federal Highways; List; Autopistas
← Fed. 101	→ Fed. 103

Federal Highway 102 (Carretera Federal 102) is a federal highway of Mexico. The highway travels from Álamo, Veracruz, in the east to Tamazunchale, San Luis Potosí, in the west. From Orizatlán to Huejutla de Reyes, the route is signed as a Hidalgo state highway rather than a federal highway.
