= Mexican Federal Highway 166 =

Highway in Mexico

Federal Highway 166
- Carretera federal 166

Route information
- Maintained by Secretariat of Infrastructure, Communications and Transportation
- Length: 48.65 km (30.23 mi)

Major junctions
- East end: Fed. 95 in Alpuyeca
- West end: Fed. 55 north of Axixintla

Location
- Country: Mexico

Highway system
- Mexican Federal Highways; List; Autopistas
← Fed. 162	→ Fed. 172

Federal Highway 166 (Carretera Federal 166) is a Federal Highway of Mexico. The highway travels from north of Axixintla, Guerrero near Grutas de Cacahuamilpa National Park in the west to Alpuyeca, Morelos in the east.
