= Mexican Federal Highway 97 =

Highway in Mexico

Federal Highway 97
- Carretera federal 97

Route information
- Maintained by Secretariat of Infrastructure, Communications and Transportation
- Length: 113.25 km (70.37 mi)

Major junctions
- North end: Fed. 2 in Reynosa
- South end: Fed. 101 / Fed. 180 in Ampliación la Loma, Tamaulipas

Location
- Country: Mexico
- State: Tamaulipas

Highway system
- Mexican Federal Highways; List; Autopistas
← Fed. 95	→ Fed. 98

Federal Highway 97 (Carretera Federal 97) is a Federal Highway of Mexico. The highway travels from Reynosa, Tamaulipas in the north to Ampliación la Loma, Tamaulipas to the south. The southern terminus of the highway is just north of General Francisco Villa, Tamaulipas.
