= Mexican Federal Highway 101 =

"Highway of Death"

Federal Highway 101
- Carretera federal 101

Route information
- Maintained by Secretariat of Communications and Transportation
- Length: 492 km (306 mi)

Major junctions
- North end: Fed. 2 in Matamoros, Tamaulipas
- Fed. 97 in General Francisco Villa Fed. 180 in La Coma; Fed. 107 in Jiménez; Fed. 83 Fed. 85 in Ciudad Victoria
- South end: Fed. 80 in Tula Junction

Location
- Country: Mexico

Highway system
- Mexican Federal Highways; List; Autopistas
← Fed. 100	→ Fed. 102

Federal Highway 101 (Spanish: Carretera Federal 101, Fed. 101) connects Matamoros, Tamaulipas, to Fed. 80 in San Luis Potosí. It passes through Ciudad Victoria, the capital of Tamaulipas, and Tula. The route traverses the Sierra Madre Oriental cordillera.

== "The Highway of Death" ==
The highway is known by local residents as the "Highway of Death". Those who traveled through this highway in 2010 and 2011 used to see "burned vehicles, bullet-shot trucks on the side of the road, and dead bodies, often decapitated, that the cartels would leave behind." Others who have traveled through this highway and have survived car hijackings and checkpoints the organized crime groups have installed from Padilla to San Fernando have reported what happens on the highway. One man who managed to survive a hijacking said:

"There were four SUVs, all grey and with tinted windows. Everyone was armed."

The violence and constant car hijackings have been so bad that bus lines avoid Fed. 101 by driving out miles away to avoid the road. Another report from a woman who survived a hijacking said through El Universal newspaper that heavily armed men would stop buses at roadblocks, and then force women and young girls at gunpoint, "strip them naked, rape them," and then drive away in trucks, leaving the passengers traumatized. One bus driver, "who said he had avoided being stopped thus far," claimed that another bus driver at the station had said that 12 people were pulled down of the passenger bus just 30 minutes before him. Other witnesses claim that once the buses were stopped, gunmen would storm the bus and point at certain passengers and say "you, you're coming down," and take them at gunpoint. The buses were then ordered to leave.

During normal times, Fed. 101 is the biggest and most important transportation system in the state of Tamaulipas, and it connects the state with Matamoros, Tamaulipas and Texas with the rest of Tamaulipas. Local residents mention that there is only traffic on this highway during daylight. As of 2012, they mention that the cartels "still kill people in San Fernando." The United States has issued travel warnings south of the border.
