= Tierra Colorada =

City in the Mexican state of Guerrero

- Municipal seat and city
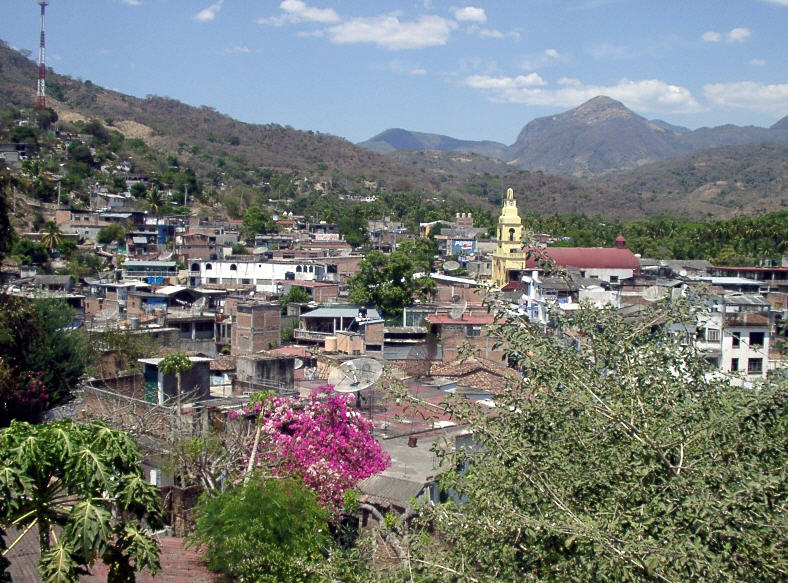

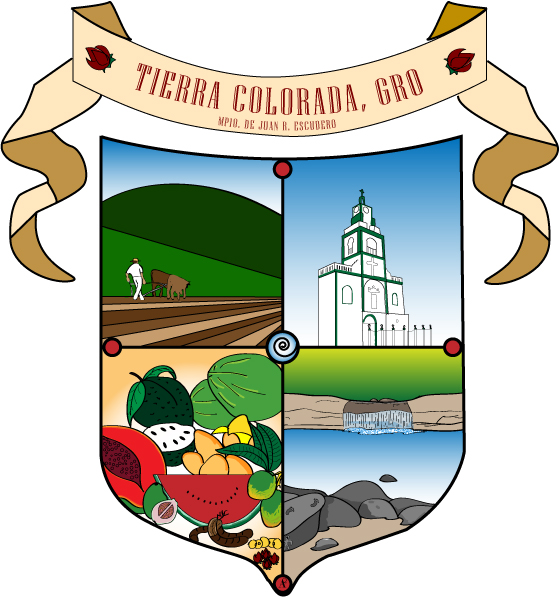
- Coat of arms

- Location in Mexico Tierra Colorada (Mexico)
- Coordinates: 17°09′56″N 99°31′35″W
- Country: Mexico
- State: Guerrero
- Municipality: Juan R. Escudero

Population (2005)
  - Total: 10,502
- Time zone: UTC-6 (Central)

Tierra Colorada is a city in the Central region of the Mexican state of Guerrero. It serves as the municipal seat of the municipality of Juan R. Escudero.

The name of this place comes from its red mountain soils. In 1849, General Juan N. Álvarez owned a hacienda in this region, which he named "Tierra Colorada", reflecting the area's characteristic soil. By 1854, the town was officially established with the name it still bears today.

== Geography ==
Located in the south-central part of the state of Guerrero, Tierra Colorada lies between the state capital, Chilpancingo de los Bravo, and the port of Acapulco. It is positioned at 17°10'08″N latitude and 99°31'19″W longitude, with an elevation of 292 meters above sea level. The city is traversed by Federal Highway 95, which connects Mexico City with Acapulco.

== Demographics ==
According to the 2020 Population and Housing Census conducted by the National Institute of Statistics and Geography, Tierra Colorada has a total population of 12,262 people, with 6,337 women and 5,925 men.
