= Mexican Federal Highway 200 =

Highway in Mexico

Federal Highway 200
- Carretera federal 200

Route information
- Maintained by Secretariat of Infrastructure, Communications and Transportation
- Length: 2,085 km (1,296 mi)

Major junctions
- West end: Fed. 15 in Tepic, Nayarit
- East end: International border at Talismán, Chiapas

Location
- Country: Mexico

Highway system
- Mexican Federal Highways; List; Autopistas
← Fed. 199	→ Fed. 203

Federal Highway 200 (Carretera Federal 200), also known as Carretera Pacífico, is a federal highway of Mexico. The Carretera Pacífico is the main leg of the Pacific Coastal Highway within Mexico and travels along the Pacific Coast from Federal Highway 15 in Tepic, Nayarit, in the north to the Guatemala–Mexico border at Talismán, Chiapas, in the south. Upon entering Guatemala, the highway continues as Central American Highway 2 (CA-2).

== Major cities along the route ==
- Tepic, Nayarit
- Puerto Vallarta, Jalisco
- Manzanillo, Colima
- Lázaro Cárdenas, Michoacán
- Zihuatanejo, Guerrero
- Tecpan de Galeana, Guerrero
- Acapulco, Guerrero
- Huatulco, Oaxaca
- Salina Cruz, Oaxaca
- Juchitán de Zaragoza, Oaxaca
- Tapachula, Chiapas
- Tuxtla Chico, Chiapas
