= Mexican Federal Highway 186 =

Highway in Mexico

Federal Highway 186
- Carretera federal 186

Route information
- Maintained by Secretariat of Infrastructure, Communications and Transportation
- Length: 574.4 km (356.9 mi)

Major junctions
- East end: Chetumal
- West end: Fed. 180 in Villahermosa

Location
- Country: Mexico

Highway system
- Mexican Federal Highways; List; Autopistas
← Fed. 185	→ Fed. 187

Federal Highway 186 (Carretera Federal 186) is a Federal Highway of Mexico. It runs from Villahermosa, Tabasco, in the west to Chetumal, Quintana Roo, in the east. In the state of Campeche it passes through the city of Escárcega, where it intersects with Federal Highway 261.
