= Iglesias law =

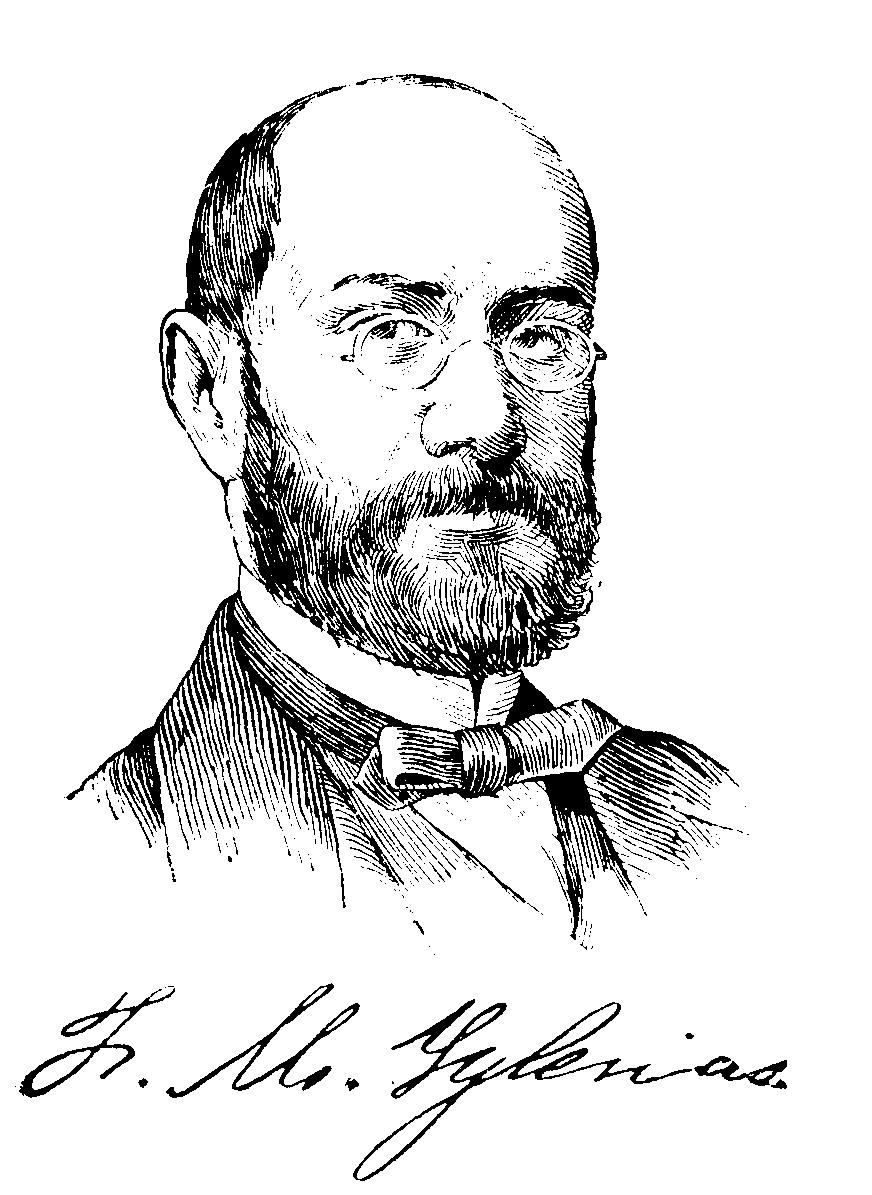
José María Iglesias

The Iglesias law or Ley Iglesias issued on 11 April 1857, is named after Liberal politician José María Iglesias and is one of the Reform laws of the Liberal reform in Mexico. Its aim was to regulate the cost of ecclesiastical fees for Catholic sacraments. Liberal politician Melchor Ocampo has raised this issue publicly in 1850, criticizing the Catholic Church for impoverishing Mexican peasants who could not afford the fees. The Catholic Church and its conservative supporters saw the Iglesias law as another piece of anticlerical legislation that diminished its power. Other laws had removed the church from its former role in recording births, marriages, and deaths as baptisms, wedding banns, holy matrimony, and burials in which priests were owed fees and created a civil registry. Ecclesiastical fees were a key financial support for parish priests, who were generally of modest means. Nonetheless, the church and its conservative supporters saw the Iglesias law as an attack on the church as an institution and denounced it as "illegal and immoral" and refused to comply with it. The law mandated penalties of exacting fees from poor peasants, defined as persons earning the minimum for survival. The fees were often paid by the owners of landed estates haciendas, and the costs added to a peasant's indebtedness (debt-servitude or debt peonage) to the owner. With mounting liberal anti-clerical legislation curtailing the power of the church and its culmination with the Constitution of 1857, conservatives revolted against the government, resulting in a three-year long civil war, the War of the Reform (1858-60).

== See also ==
- Liberalism in Mexico
- La Reforma
