= Melchor Ocampo =

19th-century Mexican lawyer and Liberal politician

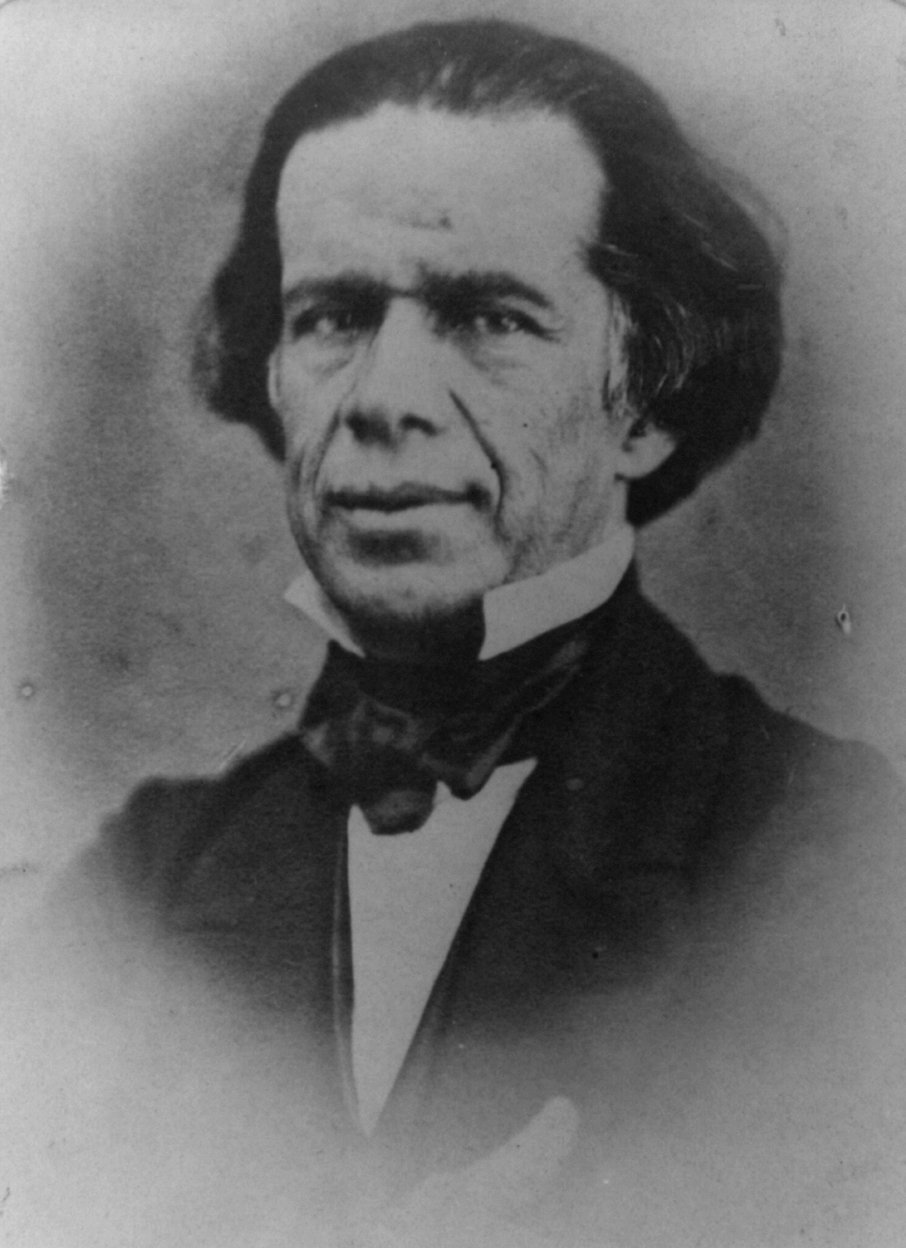
- Melchor Ocampo

Governor of Michoacán
- In office 5 September 1846 – 13 March 1848

Personal details
- Born: 5 January 1814 Maravatío, Michoacán
- Died: 3 June 1861 (aged 47) Hidalgo, Mexico

Melchor Ocampo (4 January 1814 – 3 June 1861) was a Mexican lawyer, scientist, and politician. A radical liberal, he was fiercely anticlerical, perhaps an atheist, and his early writings against the Catholic Church in Mexico gained him a reputation as a leading liberal thinker. Ocampo has been considered the heir to José María Luis Mora, the premier liberal intellectual of the early republic. He served in the administration of Benito Juárez and negotiated a controversial agreement with the United States, the McLane–Ocampo Treaty. The Mexican state where his hometown of Maravatío is located was later renamed Michoacán de Ocampo in his honor.

== Early life ==
Jose Telesforo Melchor was born in the Hacienda de Pateo, Contepec, Michoacán to José María Morquecho, an indian, and María Bernarda, mulata. Melchor Ocampo was perhaps orphaned and left abandoned at the gate of a hacienda of a wealthy woman, Doña Francisca Xaviera Tapia, who raised him as her own and bequeathed him her property. Melchor adopted Francisca Xaviera Tapia's husband surname, Don Ignacio Alas Ocampo.

Ocampo studied at the Roman Catholic seminary in Morelia, Michoacán, and later law at the Colegio Seminario de México (Universidad Pontificia). He began working in a law office in 1833. For unknown reasons, he left the practice of law and returned to his hacienda, perhaps because of its imminent bankruptcy. In 1840, he traveled to France, where he was influenced by liberal and anticlerical ideas of the Enlightenment following the French Revolution. He returned after a year to Michoacán to work his lands, practice law, investigate the region's flora and fauna, and study the local indigenous languages. More importantly, he entered politics in Michoacán, in opposition to Antonio López de Santa Anna.

== Politics ==
Ocampo was elected to the Chamber of Deputies in 1842. In 1844, Manuel Gómez Pedraza became president of Mexico and appointed Ocampo Governor of Michoacán, during the Mexican–American War (1846–48). He was an activist governor, reorganizing the state treasury, building roads, proposing the founding of schools, and improving the conditions of the national guard in Michoacán. During the Mexican–American War he recruited troops without conscription or increased taxes, but solely by persuasion. Ocampo urged that the Treaty of Guadalupe Hidalgo that ended the Mexican–American War be rejected. As governor, Ocampo appointed Santos Degollado the rector of the Colegio de San Nicolás de Hidalgo, where revolutionary Miguel Hidalgo y Costilla had served prior to his exile to the village of Dolores. Degollado later was murdered seeking the murderers of his patron Ocampo.

Ocampo's beliefs were fiercely anticlerical and challenged the power of the Roman Catholic Church in Mexico. He viewed the church as sucking wealth from indigenous people with high clerical fees for ecclesiastical services, and impeding progress. He pointed to high clerical fees for ecclesiastical services and the proliferation of fiestas, which encouraged idleness and drunkenness. These provided income for local priests as well as further impoverishing indigenous people who bought candles, incense, and fireworks. Clerical fees for Christian sacraments meant that birth, marriage, and death generated income for priests who charged for baptism, holy matrimony, and burial. A vivid story he related about this practice concerned a peasant who could not afford the burial fees for his son and asked for a free burial. "The priest refused, contending that 'this was what he lived on.' The poor man had asked, 'Sir, what shall I do with my dead son?' and the priest had answered him, 'Salt him and eat him'." The church had the responsibility for education in Mexico and like other aspects of the church's role in Mexico, access was based on the ability to pay. Ocampo advocated free, public, secular education in Mexico. He believed that education had to be grounded on the basic postulates of liberalism, democracy, respect and tolerance for different beliefs, equality before the law, the elimination of privileges, and the supremacy of civil authority. Many of these ideas were later codified in the Reform laws and the liberal Constitution of 1857.

He began a published polemical debate with a priest or a group of priests in Michoacán about the reform of clerical fees. Historian Enrique Krauze suggests that the priest was probably Clemente de Jesús Mungía, the bishop of Morelia, the state capital. Ocampo was subsequently deposed as governor and was forced to flee the country by President Antonio López de Santa Anna, taking refuge first in Cuba and then in the U.S. city of New Orleans, Louisiana. In New Orleans he met a group of fellow liberal exiles, including Benito Juárez. Ocampo began to publish pamphlets to promote political change in Mexico. He returned to Mexico in 1855 following the successful ouster of Santa Anna under the Plan of Ayutla. The plan had called for the overthrow of Santa Anna and the installation of the liberal general Juan Álvarez as president of Mexico. With Álvarez's victory, Ocampo served briefly in his cabinet as foreign minister, but when Álvarez stepped down and Ignacio Comonfort became president, Ocampo returned to Michoacán. He was then elected to the Constitutional Convention that drafted the liberal Constitution of 1857, which included strong provisions for the separation of church and state.

=== Juárez Administration (1858–1861) ===
During Benito Juárez's administration during the civil war between liberals and conservatives, known as the War of the Reform, Ocampo served in various high posts, including Minister of the Interior, with responsibility also for foreign affairs, defense, and the treasury. Ocampo became embroiled in a bitter dispute about the implementation of the Lerdo Law, which called for the sale of property of corporations, meaning the Roman Catholic Church and indigenous communities which was aimed at undermining the economic power of the church and creating a yeoman peasantry of small landowners. Ocampo charged that the law was counterproductive, strengthening the power of the church and preventing the acquisition of land by those of modest means.

The most controversial act of Ocampo was negotiating the McLane–Ocampo Treaty in 1859, when he served the Liberal government of Benito Juárez. The regime was strapped for cash to pursue the War of the Reform against conservatives. In the port of Veracruz, on 14 December 1859, acting on Juárez's orders, he and U.S. Ambassador Robert Milligan McLane signed the treaty. This controversial treaty would have awarded the United States perpetual transit rights, for its armies and merchandise, through three zones of Mexico's territory: the Isthmus of Tehuantepec; a corridor running from Guaymas, Sonora, to Nogales, Arizona; and a second transoceanic route from Mazatlán, Sinaloa, on the Pacific to Brownsville, Texas, on the Gulf of Mexico. The treaty was aimed at getting U.S. recognition for the Juárez government and gain the regime two million dollars in much needed funding. Ocampo did attach an appendix, attempting to protect Mexican sovereignty. Although presidents Juárez and Buchanan were both in favor of the arrangement, the U.S. Senate rejected it on 31 May 1860 on account of the impending Civil War in the United States. Ocampo traveled to the U.S. to ascertain if that it would support the liberal cause if they were unable to defeat the conservatives on the battlefield. The treaty exacerbated the rancor between Ocampo and Miguel Lerdo de Tejada and Ocampo resigned from Juárez's cabinet in January 1860. Juárez rejected the treaty in November 1860.

With the defeat of the conservatives in the War of the Reform in 1860, Mexican presidential elections were held. Ocampo might have been a candidate, but backed Juárez against his rival Miguel Lerdo. "Juárez may have needed the such help, for even though president, he was viewed by many as second rate in comparison to Ocampo and Lerdo." By 1861, both Miguel Lerdo and Ocampo were both dead, with Ocampo murdered by conservative guerrillas after he returned to civilian life.

== Death ==
Some months after retiring from public service, Melchor Ocampo was abducted from his hacienda in Michoacán by conservative guerrillas on orders from either Leonardo Márquez or Félix María Zuloaga or both (reports differ). The historian Enrique Krauze gives a vivid account of Ocampo's last days, saying that Ocampo's captors allowed him to write his will, where he recognized his natural daughters and identified their mother, information the children did not know. Ocampo was executed by firing squad on 3 June 1861 at the Hacienda of Tlaltengo, Tepeji del Río, in what is today the state of Hidalgo. After the firing squad, his execution included "the finishing bullet in the head, [and] they hung the body of Melchor Ocampo from a tree." His loyal follower, Santos Degollado, pursued Ocampo's executioners and "was himself ambushed, captured, and executed by the conservatives. Ocampo's murder was a scandal, and Juárez's government took "more extreme measures" to repress the conservatives. The remains of Ocampo are interred in the Rotonda de los Hombres Ilustres in Mexico City.

== Legacy ==
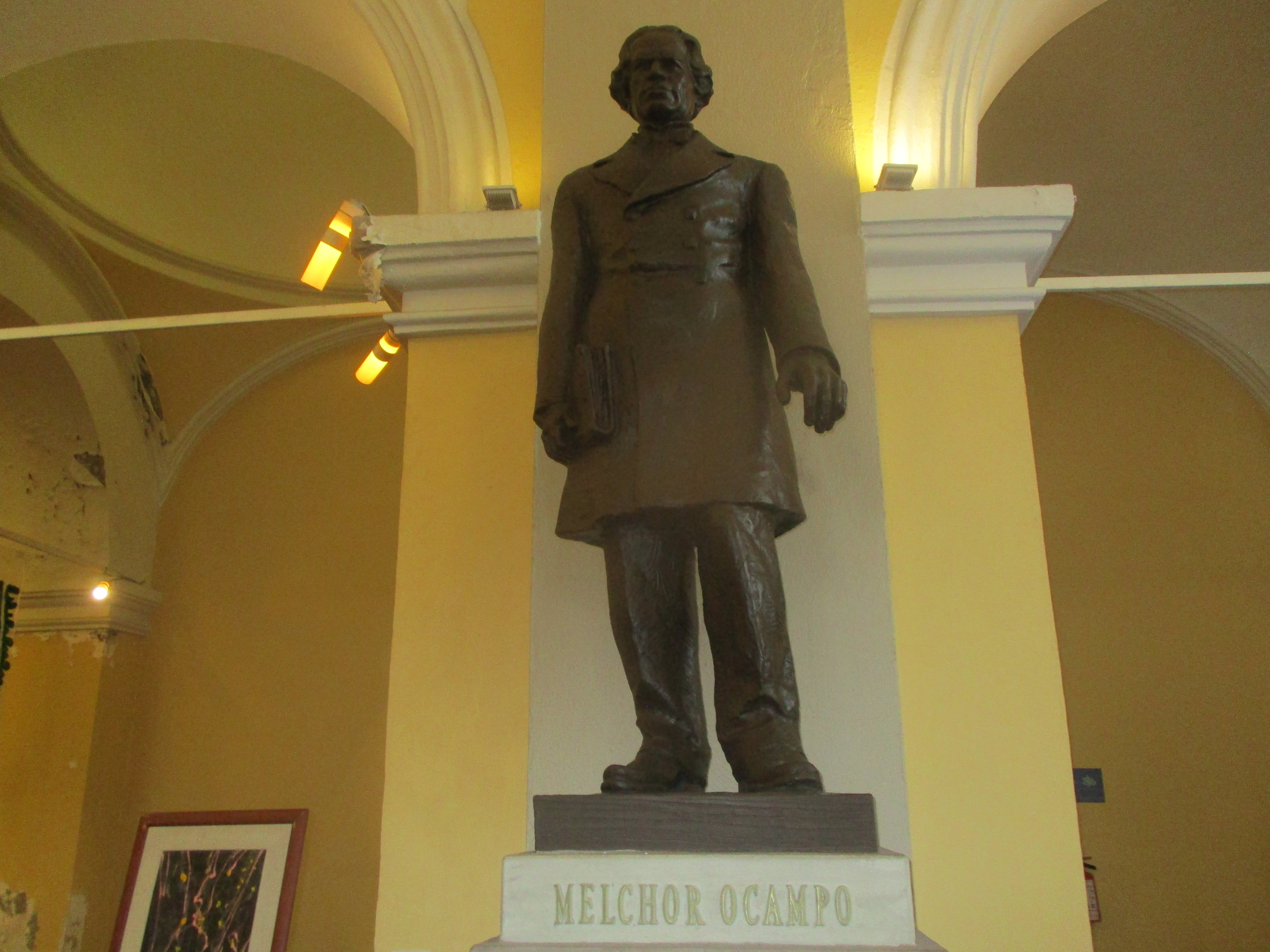
Monument in Veracruz

He participated in writing new Civil Laws, that in the end would give sense to liberal politics and would end up amending the Constitution from 1857, in order to make civil and political matters independent from ecclesiastic ones. On July 23, 1859, D. Benito Juarez, interim president then, issues, at the Port of Veracruz, the "Civil Matrimony Law", which has 31 Articles. In Article 15, as a way of ceremonial formalization, the famous epistle, attributed to Melchor Ocampo, was included; and which reads as follows:

I declare on behalf of Law and Society that you are united in legitimate matrimony with all rights and privileges granted by law, and with the obligations imposed; and also declare:

“That this is the only moral mean to establish a family, to conserve the human species and to make up for the imperfections of an individual who cannot provide for itself to reach mankind’s perfection. This doesn’t exist in a single person, but in spousal duality. Those married must be and will be sacred to each other, even more than what they are to each self.

The man, whose main sexual attributes are courage and strength, must give and shall always give the woman protection, food, and direction, treating her always as the most delicate, sensible, and finest part of himself, and with magnanimity and generous benevolence that a strong being owes the weak, essentially when this weak delivers to himself, and also when Society has entrusted him.

The woman, whose main attributes are self denial, beauty, compassion, shrewdness and tenderness, must give and shall always give the husband obedience, pleasantness, assistance, comfort, and advice; treating him always with the veneration owed to the person supporting and defending us, and with the delicacy of whom doesn’t want to exasperate the abrupt, irritable and harsh part of him, which is of his nature.

One to another are owed and shall always give respect, deference, fidelity, trust, and tenderness; both will take care of what they were expecting from each other by joining together, and that this will not be contradicted by this union. That both shall be prudent and attenuate their faults. You shall never say insults to each other, because insults among the married dishonors the one saying them, and proves the lack of judgment or common sense of election; and much less shall physically mistreat each other, because it is vile and cowardly to use force.

Both shall prepare with the study, friendly and mutual correction of their defects, up to the supreme judgeship of being family parents, in order to when both become that, your children can find in you good example and good conduct to serve as role models. The doctrine that you inspire in these tender and loved bonds of affection will make your luck to prosper or to be adverse; and the happiness or misfortune of your children will be the parent’s reward or punishment, fortune or sadness.

Society blesses, believes, and praises good parents, for the great good they do to it, for giving them good and courteous citizens; and the same properly censures and despises those, that by abandonment, or misgiving affection, or by setting bad example, corrupt the sacred depot that nature trusted them with, for granting them such children.

And last, when Society sees that such said persons did not deserve to be elevated to have the honor to become parents, but merely should have lived subject to guardianship, incapable of conducting themselves with dignity, grieves for establishing with its authority the union of a man and a woman who have failed to be free and to conduct themselves towards good.”

(Translated by: TRANSFLO)

This is Ocampo's best-known legacy from 1859, which is known as the epistle on marriage, still read out nowadays by judges presiding over civil weddings in many states.

Epístola de Melchor Ocampo (in Spanish)

== See also ==
- Liberalism in Mexico
