= 1854 Mexican presidential referendum =

- 1 December 1854
- Should the current President of the Republic continue in the supreme command with the same broad powers as currently exercised?

Results
Choice	Votes	%
Yes	435,530	99.07%
No	4,075	0.93%
Total votes	439,605	100.00%

A referendum on whether Antonio López de Santa Anna should remain president, and if not, who should replace him, was held in Mexico on 1 December 1854. The proposal was approved by 99% of voters. On 11 December Santa Anna ordered reprisal measures against those who had voted no; the ballot was not secret. On 2 January 1855 he declared that the country had confirmed his position in office. He was subsequently overthrown on 8 December that year.

== Background ==
Santa Anna took over as president for a year in 1853. On taking office on 20 April, he abolished the 1824 constitution and ruled as a dictator. On 16 December he declared himself President for Life. After the Plan of Ayutla was proclaimed in March 1854, aimed at reinstituting the 1824 constitution, a revolt started. As it spread, the decision was made to hold a referendum.

However, the press was only allowed to announce the referendum on the day it was held. Voting was not secret and voters had to name and sign their ballots.

== Results ==
Should the current President of the Republic continue in the supreme command with the same broad powers as currently exercised?

Choice	Votes	%
For	435,530	99.07
Against	4,075	0.93
Total	439,605	100.00
Source: Direct Democracy

The second question was:

If he does not continue with the same broad powers as now vested, who shall immediately command?
