= La Reforma =

1850s Mexican laws for social, political, and economic modernization

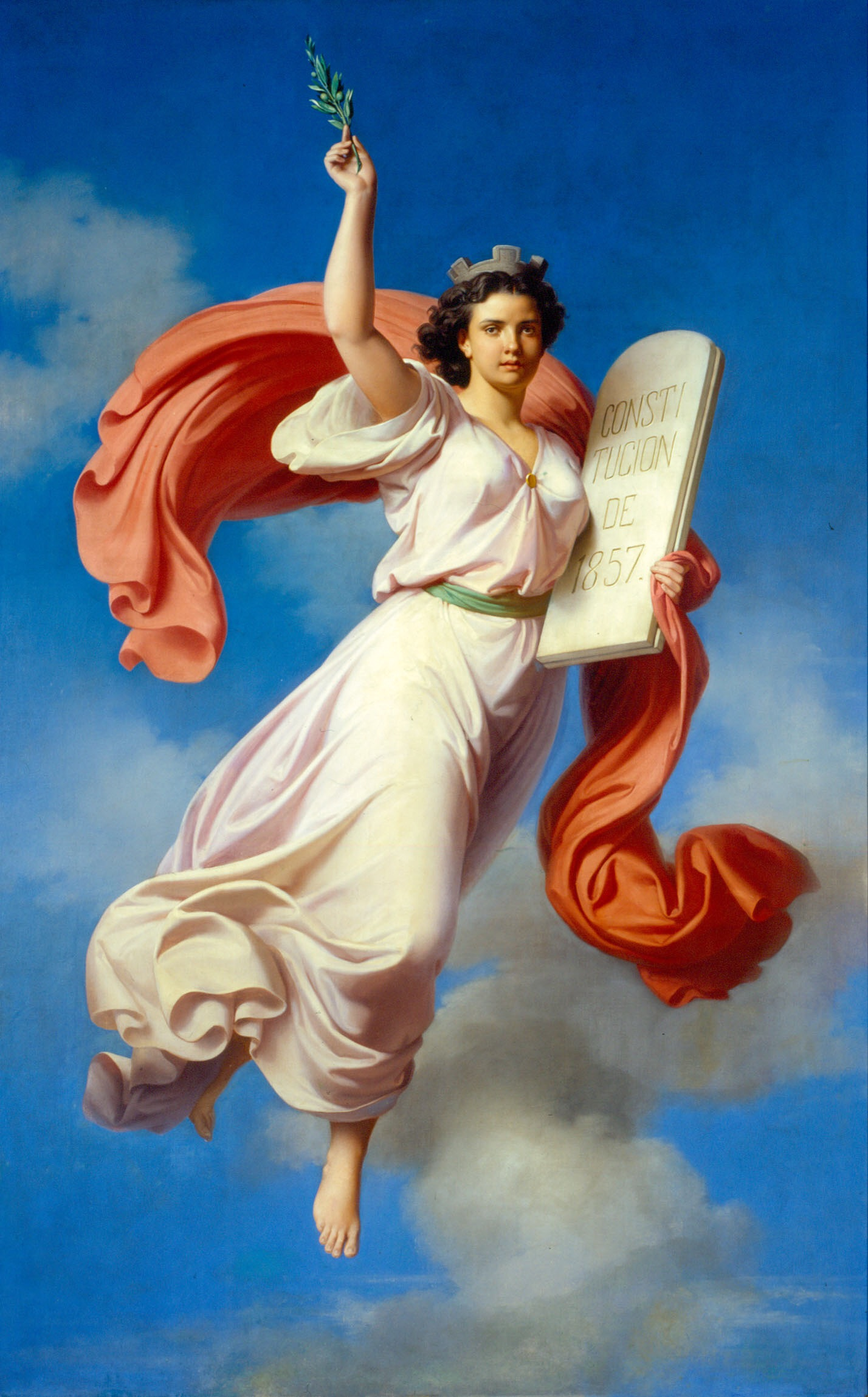
Allegory of the Constitution of 1857, Petronilo Monroy, 1869.

In the history of Mexico, La Reforma (from Spanish: "The Reform"), or Reform Laws, refers to a pivotal set of laws, including a new constitution, that were enacted in the Second Federal Republic of Mexico during the 1850s after the Plan of Ayutla had overthrown the dictatorship of Antonio López de Santa Anna. They were intended as modernizing measures: social, political, and economic, aimed at undermining the traditional power of the Catholic Church and the army. The reforms sought separation of church and state, equality before the law, and economic development. The anticlerical laws were enacted in the Second Mexican Republic between 1855 and 1863, during the governments of Juan Álvarez, Ignacio Comonfort and Benito Juárez. The laws also limited the ability of the church and the Indigenous communities to hold land collectively.

The liberal government sought the revenues from the disentailment of church property to fund the civil war against Mexican conservatives and to broaden the base of property ownership in Mexico and encouraging private enterprise. Several of the laws were raised to constitutional status by the constituent Congress that drafted the liberal Constitution of 1857. Although the laws had a major impact on the Catholic Church in Mexico, liberal proponents were not opposed to the church as a spiritual institution but rather sought a secular state and a society not dominated by religion.

The Juárez Law reduced the power that military and ecclesiastical courts held. The Lerdo Law forced land that was held in collective ownership to be sold to individual owners. It aimed at creating a dynamic real estate market, creating a class of yeoman farmers owning their own land, and raising revenue for the state. The measure was intended to strip the Church of most of its property, as well as to break the Indigenous communities' collective ownership of land.

Both laws were later integrated into the Constitution of 1857, which also contained many other liberal reform measures. It was published on February of that year and was meant to come into power in September. The constitution allotted considerable power to Mexican states and gave Congress power over the President. Conservatives pushed back against the parts of the constitution that were perceived to infringe upon the rights of the church, and controversy was further inflamed when the government mandated that all civil servants take an oath to uphold the new constitution, which left Catholic public servants with the choice of keeping their jobs or being excommunicated.

In December, a section of the army under Félix Zuloaga rebelled under the Plan of Tacubaya. The controversy that had raged throughout the year convinced President Ignacio Comonfort to accept the plan, amounting to a self-coup, which recognized him as president and increased his executive powers, believing that he could bring about a compromise between radical liberals and conservatives. When that failed, and the country began to plunge into civil war, he resigned, and the constitutional line of succession handed the presidency over to Benito Juárez, president of the Supreme Court. The War of the Reform broke out, lasting three years, between the liberal government under Benito Juárez and the conservative government under Zuloaga and others. During the war, Juárez outright nationalized most church properties in the states under his control. The war raged until December 1860, when the liberals emerged triumphant.

Almost immediately after the end of the war, French Emperor Napoleon III used Juárez's suspension of foreign debts as a pretext to invade Mexico in 1862 and sought local help in setting up a client state. Seeing that as an opportunity to undo the Reform, conservative generals and statesmen joined the French and invited Habsburg Archduke Maximilian to become Emperor of Mexico. Maximilian, however, proved to be ideologically a liberal as emperor and actually ratified the Reform Laws. Regardless, Juárez's government resisted and fought the French and Imperial Mexican forces with the material and financial aid of the United States.

The French withdrew, which caused the monarchy to collapse in 1867. The liberals achieved a decisive victory, and the Constitution of 1857 would remain in force all throughout the dictatorship of Porfirio Diaz until he was overthrown by the Mexican Revolution. It caused the Constitution to be replaced by the Constitution of 1917, which remains in force to this day.

== Background ==
Similar government reforms to those that would characterize La Reforma were first attempted under the liberal presidency of Valentín Gómez Farías, who assumed power in April 1833. Among a wider program of economic and social reform, the government closed church schools, assumed the right to make clerical appointments to the church, and closed monasteries. The time of great anti-clerical agitation was led by men such as Lorenzo de Zavala and José Luis Mora. The measure to assume the patronato, the right to make appointments to the Catholic Church, was actually passed over the opposition of Gómez Farías.

Opposition to Gómez Farías's anticlerical measures and other policies resulted in a series of rebellions, and his own vice-president, Antonio López de Santa Anna, would join the rebels. In April 1835, Gómez Farías fell from power by a military coup, like many of his predecessors in the tumultuous era of the First Republic. The question of nationalizing church properties then remained mostly dormant until La Reforma.

On 1 March 1854, the Plan of Ayutla was proclaimed against Santa Anna's dictatorship, which indicted him for selling the Mesilla Valley to the United States, the Gadsden Purchase; acting as a repressive dictator, and eliminating democratic institutions. The revolution was led by colonel Florencio Villarreal, Juan Álvarez, and Ignacio Comonfort. It spread to many parts of the country and succeeded in October 1855.

Álvarez assumed the presidency on an interim basis and convened a congress. An important aspect of Juan Álvarez was the including in his cabinet of young liberals, which was important for the history of Mexico, since Melchor Ocampo, Benito Juárez, Guillermo Prieto and Ignacio Comonfort were men who had the opportunity of active political participatation. In his administration, Álvarez was dedicated to make laws that keep the country under the ideals of liberalism, as the Juárez Law, and the provision of Ocampo depriving the right to vote by the clergy. For personal reasons, Álvarez resigned in December 1855, which made Comonfort become the country's president.

== Álvarez presidency ==
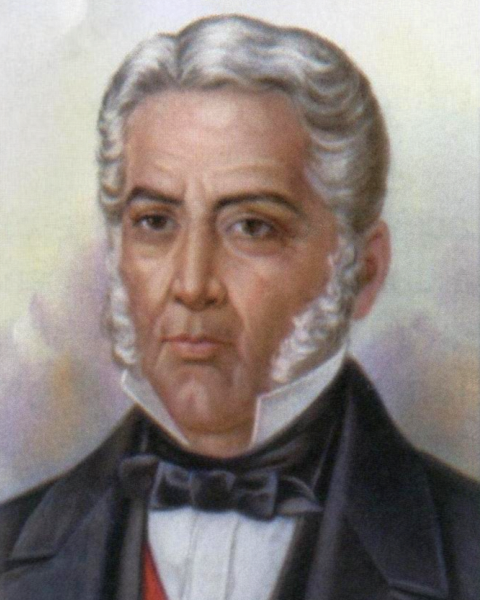
Juan Álvarez

Santa Anna's conservative dictatorship of the early 1850s was overthrown by a liberal insurgency, whose principles were laid out in the Plan of Ayutla. The plan had a provision for drafting a new constitution. A government led by the liberal Juan Álvarez assumed power in November 1855. His cabinet was radical and included prominent liberals Benito Juárez, Miguel Lerdo de Tejada, Melchor Ocampo, and Guillermo Prieto, as well as the more moderate Ignacio Comonfort. Clashes in the cabinet led to the resignation of the radical Ocampo, but the administration was passed significant reforms.

- Ley Juárez, or the Law on Administration of Justice and the Courts Organic Nation District and Territories, was issued by Juárez on 23 November 1855. It was rejected by the archbishops of Mexico since it restricted ecclesiastical privileges (fueros).
- Ley Lafragua, or the Law on the Freedom of the Press, allowed freedom of expression in print media and entered into force on December 28, 1855. It was promulgated by the Secretary of Foreign Affairs and the Interior, José María Lafragua.

=== Juárez Law ===
On 23 November 1855, the Ley Juárez, named after Justice Minister Benito Juárez, abolished the jurisdiction that military and ecclesiastical courts had over purely civil cases. Liberals criticized the existence of both courts for being biased towards their defendants. In the case of the ecclesiastical courts, their jurisdiction extended even to tenants living on extensive church-owned land, and creditors could not sue such tenants in civil court. Conservatives accused the government of hypocrisy for acting on the pretext of establishing legal equality for all but maintaining the legal immunity that existed for members of the government.

Further dissension within liberal ranks led to Álvarez resigning in December 1855, and handing the presidency over to the more moderate Comonfort, who chose a new cabinet.

== Comonfort presidency ==
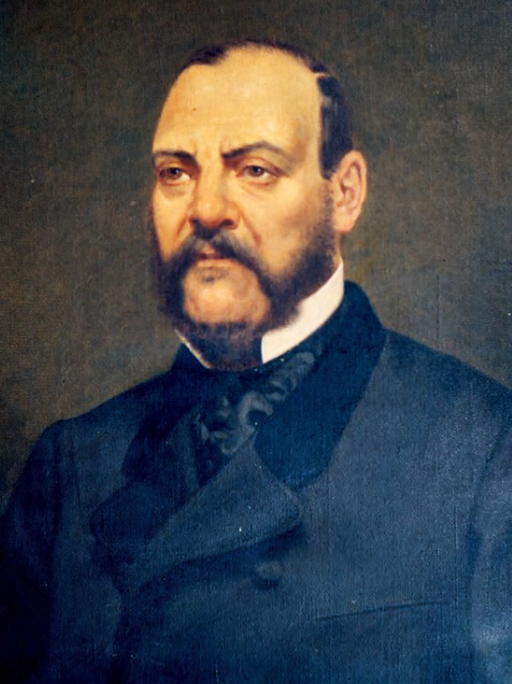
President Comonfort

A constituent congress first met on 14 February 1856. A motion to reestablish the Constitution of 1824 was defeated by a single vote, and a committee was formed towards the end of February to revise the constitution. The Juárez Law was ratified in April. A provisional constitution, borrowing many principles from the Constitution of the United States, was promulgated in June.

- The decree that abolished civil coercion of religious vows was promulgated on April 26, 1856.
- The decree that suppressed the Society of Jesus in Mexico was promulgated on June 5, 1856.
- The Lerdo law, or the Law of Confiscation of Property Plots and Urban Civil and Ecclesiastical Corporations, forced the civil, such as Indigenous communities, and ecclesiastical corporations to sell houses and land to private individuals. It was drafted by Miguel Lerdo de Tejada (brother of Sebastián Lerdo de Tejada) and was promulgated on June 25, 1856. It is considered the most controversial of all the Reform laws, but it was part of a process that had been initiated during Spanish rule in the eighteenth century.
- The Lafragua Law, or the Civil Registration Act, established the Civil Registry for births, marriages, and deaths and removed it from the Roman Catholic Church, which had kept records of baptism, matrimony, and death. It was issued on January 27, 1857.
- The Constitution of 1857 was promulgated on February 5, 1857. The republican and federalist liberal Valentín Gómez Farías fought for those ideals throughout his life during the Cortes of Cádiz, the Independence of Mexico, and the Constitution of 1824, which had been repealed by the centralist regime of Antonio López de Santa Anna.
- The Iglesias law, or Rights Act, and parochial perquisites banned the collection of fees, parochial perquisites, and tithes to the poor classes. It was drafted by José María Iglesias and promulgated on April 11, 1857. One of Comonfort's supporters, Juan José Baz, considered the law a provocation of the lower clergy, which depended on such fees.

=== Lerdo Law ===
In June 1856, another major controversy emerged over the promulgation of the Ley Lerdo, named after the secretary of the treasury, Miguel Lerdo de Tejada, brother of fellow Liberal, and future President of Mexico, Sebastián Lerdo de Tejada. The law was aimed at the collective or corporate ownership of real estate. It forced 'civil or ecclesiastical institutions' to sell any land that they owned, with the tenants getting priority and generous terms for buying the land on which they lived. It was aimed not only at the Catholic Church, which held considerable real estate, but also at Mexico's Indigenous communities that were forced to sell their communally-held lands, the ejidos.

On 1 July, José Lázaro de la Garza y Ballesteros protested to the government that the properties were likely to be bought by a few rich individuals, argued that the church had lent to the government during crises, and he defended the church's record of treating tenants more generously than private owners. Minister of Justice Ezequiel Montes received him courteously, but the protests resulted in no change in government policy José Julián Tornel wrote a pamphlet defending the church's role as both lender and landlord and warned that the private market in both fields would be much less generous to the public.

The law was designed to develop Mexico's economy by increasing the amount of private property owners, but in practice, the land was bought up by rich speculators. Most of the lost Indigenous lands went to haciendas.

=== Freedom of religion ===
One of the major issues brought up during the constituent congress was that of religious toleration. The Catholic religion had been one of the three leading principles in the Plan of Iguala. Subsequently, Mexico was founded as and remained a confessional state with Catholicism as the sole religion permitted ever since the Constitution of 1824.

Deputy Lafragua, a liberal and one of Comonfort's ministers, actually argued against religious toleration by making the case that the nation was not ready for it, and he feared that the measure would simply provoke social upheaval. Concerns about affecting social cohesion by removing the exclusivity of Catholicism were an important theme during the debates on the topic.

A notable issue being brought up by proponents of religious toleration was that it would promote European immigration. LaFragua assured the congress that he was a proponent of immigration, but he made the case that it was not the lack of religious toleration that impeded immigration but rather the lack of security and good roads. The liberal Deputy Mata argued that religious intolerance was the only obstacle in the way of European immigration, and he cited the case of a group of German colonists, consisting of thirty thousand families, which considered immigrating to Mexico in the wake of the 1848 Revolution but ultimately opted to go to the United States because of Mexico's lack of both religious freedom and trial by jury. Deputy Francisco Zarco argued that European settlement of Mexican California could have prevented the United States from annexing that territory. He defended Deputy Mata's claims on German immigration and added his own experience in working with the Prussian minister to highlight the importance of religious toleration to the immigration question.

The issue of religious toleration was referred to a committee in August 1855, and the question was ultimately shelved by January 1856. The new constitution would ultimately not explicitly promise freedom of religion, yet in contrast to previous constitutions, it did not declare Catholicism the sole religion of the land, leading to a de facto state of religious freedom.

=== Constitution of 1857 ===
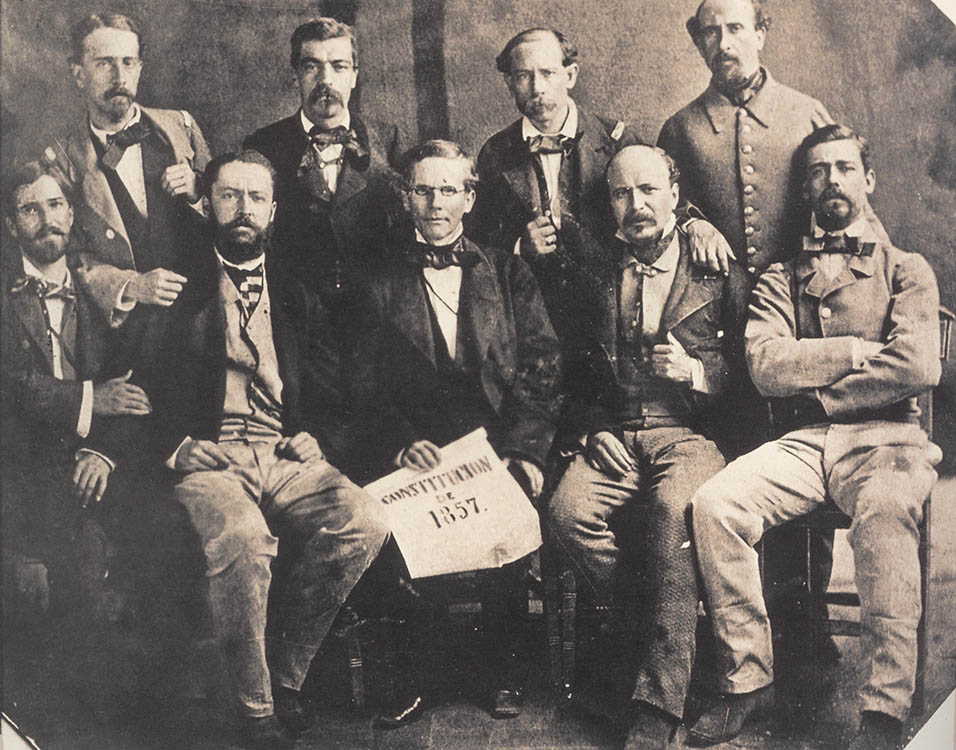
Liberals posing with a copy of the Constitution of 1857.

The Constitution of 1857 was finally promulgated in 5 February. It was nominally federalist by granting the states an element of sovereignty, yet it also gave the federal government more power than had the federalist Constitution of 1824. Congress was given the ability to impeach state governors. The previously bicameral congress was also made unicameral to discard the conservative leaning upper house but also in the hope that a single united chamber could be stronger against any autocratic tendencies coming from the executive branch. National elections were made indirect, the public choosing electors from their district, who subsequently chose the congressmen, the president, and members of the supreme court.

There were also many liberal guarantees such as freedom of speech, freedom of the press, freedom of assembly, freedom of education, freedom to bear arms, and a reiteration of Mexico's prohibition of slavery. Article 123 of the Constitution read that "the federal government retains the exclusive right to exercise, in the matters of religious practice and external discipline, whatever intervention may be designated by the laws," which led critics to ponder its exact meaning and to believe that the government intended to interfere in Catholic worship.

The constitution also made itself inviolable by asserting itself as binding even during an armed insurrection, which Mexico had experienced multiple times. The constitution also codified the Juárez Law and the Lerdo Laws.

As an effort to radically change the nation radically but still an attempt at a compromise, the constitution managed to alienate both liberals and conservatives. Melchor Ocampo, and Ignacio Ramirez both expressed dissatisfaction with the document as not progressive enough. According to Mexican historian Ignacio Manuel Altamirano, President Comonfort "did not accept the Constitution in his heart." Conservatives continued to decry the Lerdo Law. On 5 February 1857, the deputies of the constituent congress, and the president proclaimed the constitution and swore an oath to it though the document was not meant to take force until 16 September. Among those present was the now-elderly former President Valentín Gómez Farías, who had first attempted similar reforms two decades earlier.

==== Oath of fealty ====
On 17 March 1857, it was decreed that all civil servants had to publicly swear and sign and oath to the constitution. On 13 November, the Catholic Church, which had not then taken a formal stand on the constitution, ordered the clergy to not swear allegiance to it. As for Catholic parishioners, swearing allegiance would result in excommunication. Anyone who had taken Church property under the Ley Lerdo was also excommunicated. Civil servants swearing fealty were to resign. A public retraction of fealty would restore their standing. Most government employees took the oath though a few were fired for refusing. In the Church's view, if a Catholic "persisted in following civil authority, he was doomed to hell."

The Franco-Mexican and liberal paper Trait d'Union now proclaimed that war had been declared between church and state and featured stories on who had refused the oath, including judges and other federal civil servants. The press also noted many cases of minor and local officials also refusing the oath. Others retracted their oaths to be able to receive the sacraments during Lent, which had begun shortly after the decree that year.

Liberal officials struck back at opposition to the oath and to the constitution. Governor Juárez of Oaxaca expelled all priests who refused Catholic burial to supporters of the constitution. In Aguascalientes, Vice-Governor Lopez de Nava also cracked down on those refusing to take the oath by depriving them of political rights. Governor Miguel Cástulo Alatriste of Puebla outright ordered public prayers for the success of the constitutional authorities.

=== Conservative resistance and the Plan of Tacubaya ===
Amidst armed uprisings and rumors of conspiracy, on 3 November, Congress granted President Comonfort autocratic powers to maintain order and suspended among others the constitutional clauses on freedom of speech, freedom of assembly, and freedom to bear arms and the suspensions to remain in effect until 30 April 1858. Comonfort had meanwhile won the 1857 presidential election and assumed his term as constitutional president on 1 December.

On 17 December, General Félix María Zuloaga, from the outskirts of Mexico City proclaimed the Plan of Tacubaya, declared the Constitution of 1857 as not in accord with the customs of the Mexican nation and offered to give supreme power to President Comonfort, who was to convoke a new constituent congress to produce a new constitution, which was to be approved by a national plebiscite before coming into effect. The same day, congress condemned the plan and deposed Comonfort from the presidency. Zuloaga's troops entered the capital on 18 December and dissolved congress. The following day, Comonfort accepted the role as proposed by Plan of Tacubaya and released a manifesto making the case that more moderate reforms were needed under the current circumstances.

== Juárez Presidency, 1858-1872 ==
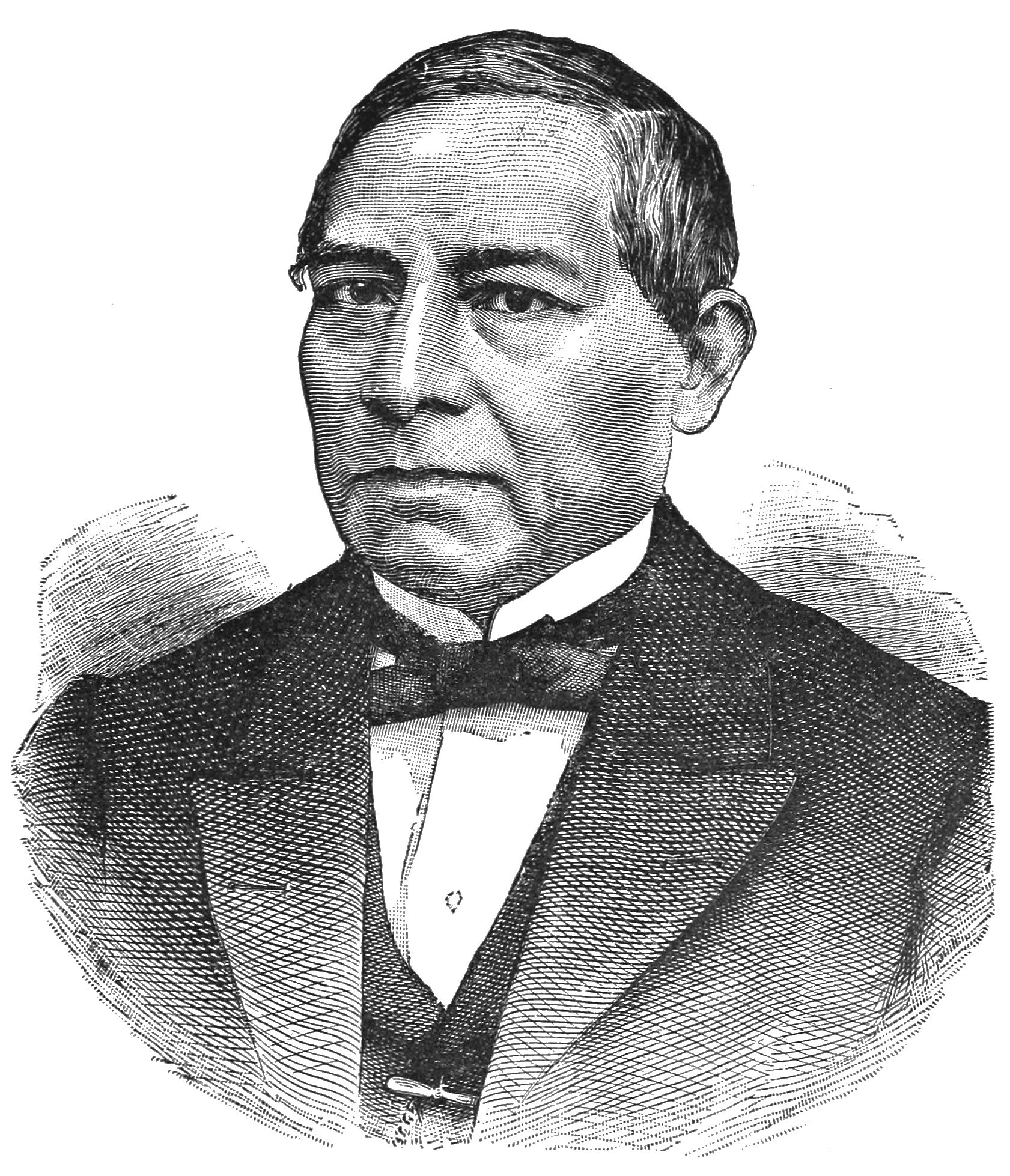
President Benito Juárez

The Plan of Tacubaya did not lead to national reconciliation. Comonfort realized that he had helped trigger a civil war, and he began to back away from Zuloaga and the conservatives. He resigned the presidency and left the country in January 1858, after which the constitutional presidency passed to the President of the Supreme Court, Benito Juárez. The Conservative government in the capital summoned a council of representatives, which elected Zuloaga as president, and the states of Mexico proclaimed their loyalties to either Zuloaga or Juárez.

- The Law on the Nationalization of Ecclesiastical Property complemented the Ley Lerdo's confiscation of church property, with an important change: goods would no longer pass into the hands of rentiers. It was issued in Veracruz on July 12, 1859 and explicitly made the connection between the national debt and disamortization on which early-19th-century politicians and ideologues Lorenzo de Zavala and José María Luis Mora had written. In fact, the church held more of its wealth in mortgages to private landowners than in its own property ownership.
- The Civil Marriage Act was issued in Veracruz on July 23, 1859. It established that religious marriage had no official validity and that marriage as a civil contract with the State. That eliminated the forcible intervention of priests and collection by the churches.
- The Law of Civil Registration made registration of civil status of persons to be the charge of government employees and no longer the church and births and deaths to become a civil contract with the State declared. It was issued in Veracruz on July 28, 1859.
- The Decree Secularizing Cemeteries declared the cessation of any intervention of the clergy in cemeteries and graveyards. It was released in Veracruz on July 31, 1859.
- The Decree on the Suppression of Religious Holidays declared the days that were to be taken as holidays and prohibited official assistance to religious functions.
- The Law on the Freedom of Religion made Catholicism cease to be the only religion allowed and made each person free to practice and choose his own Also, it banned ceremonies from taking place outside churches or temples. It was issued in Veracruz on December 4, 1860.
- The Expulsion Decree of Church Officials ordered the exile of Apostolic DelegateLuis Clementi, Archbishop José Lázaro de la Garza y Ballesteros and Bishops Pedro Espinosa y Dávalos and Pedro Barajas y Moreno. It was released in Mexico City on January 21, 1861.
- The Decree Secularizing Hospitals and Charities, traditional institutions of the church, was issued in Mexico City on February 2, 1861.
- The Decree Secularizing Nuns and Friarsdecreed the exit of religious men and women in the republic's cloisters and monasteries, and they died with the exception of the Sisters of Charity.

=== War of Reform ===
The subsequent civil war would rage until December 1860. Throughout the conflict, there would be more measures from the liberal authorities aimed at the church against opponents of the constitution and attempts to build upon the reforms that had been attempted throughout the Constitution of 1857.

On 16 June 1859, Zacatecas Goveronr Jesús González Ortega passed severe decrees aimed at any priest agitating against the Constitution of 1857 by prescribing the death penalty for acts including denying the sacraments to Catholics who had taken the oath of loyalty to the constitution. The death penalty was applied even to laymen who agreed to serve as witnesses for those wishing to prove that they had retracted their oaths to the constitution.

In July 1859, at the urging of Minister Miguel Lerdo de Tejada, President Juarez decreed the outright nationalization of all church property, including land, church buildings, and even the interior furnishings. Legal pretexts were sought in the old Spanish system of law by which church property had been held in trust for the crown, whose authority over such church wealth, the government argued, had now passed down to the Mexican Republic. Cemeteries were nationalized, and civil marriage was instituted. Liberal generals now stripped churches of all valuables such as precious metals and gems to sell for the war effort. Sacred icons and relics were tossed into bonfires as demonstrations against superstition. The war would end in December 1860, with the liberals triumphing.

=== French intervention and the Second Mexican Empire, 1862-1867 ===
At the instigation of Mexican monarchist exiles, using Juárez' 1861 suspension of foreign debts as a pretext, and with the American Civil War preventing the enforcement of the Monroe Doctrine, Napoleon III invaded Mexico in 1862, and sought local help in setting up a client state. Seeing this as an opportunity to undo the Reform, conservative generals and statesmen joined the French and invited Habsburg archduke Maximilian to become Emperor of Mexico. Emperor Maximilian, however, proved to be of liberal inclinations by ratlfying the Reform Laws, with religious freedom being maintained and sales of church property continuing. Nonetheless, he still was willing to declare Catholicism the state religion, with the clergy being paid by the state after the custom of European Catholic monarchies. Negotiations with the Papal Nuncio stalled, and the matter was referred to the Vatican.

Regardless of the Emperor's liberal intentions, the government of Benito Juárez still resisted and fought the French and Mexican Imperial forces with the backing of the United States, which, after the end of the Civil War, could once again enforce the Monroe Doctrine. The French eventually withdrew, leading the monarchy to collapse in 1867. The liberals returned to power in a period known as the Restored Republic (1867-1876), which is often considered the end date of the Reform Era.

=== Lerdo de Tejada Presidency ===
- Act of September 25, 1874

== Legacy ==
Through the issuance of these laws and decrees Mexico achieved the separation of church and state. The new constitution polarized society. In December 1857, the Conservatives ignored the government and the new constitution by the Plan of Tacubaya, which began the War of the Reform, or the Three Years' War. Liberals achieved victory on 1 January 1861, when President Juárez returned to Mexico City. It is for that reason that several of the decrees and laws were issued in the port of Veracruz. However, the country's stability was again interrupted, and the government had to suspend payments on foreign debt. By the London Convention, the governments of France, Britain and Spain decided to intervene in Mexico. There was agreement between the British and the Spanish but not the French, who used the pretext and had the help of the Conservatives to begin armed intervention. Shortly afterward, the Second Mexican Empire was achieved. Juárez was forced to flee the capital with his itinerant government.

=== Economic ===
Liberals sought economic development under the assumption that the economy would flourish by the reordering of the landholding structure. For that reason, they targeted the corporate holdings of both the church and the Indigenous communities, which held ownership in common. Liberals saw both of them as stumbling blocks to economic development, which they envisioned as the creation of a class of small-scale yeoman farmers. They targeted the Indigenous communities' material support and sought to transform Indigenous people from being ethnically, socially, and economically separate from Mexico so that they would become individual citizens of the secular Mexican nation-state, rather than members of their community.

Both the breaking up of the collective Indigenous communities landholdings and the giving of members a chance to purchase parcels that would be held as private property were failures. The individual community members did not have the capital to purchase such holdings and so the buyers were largely well-off non-Indigenous people, who could now acquire land suddenly on the market. Many buyers were large estate owners, who could expand the holdings, but a number were liberals. Although the liberals sought to undermine the church's economic power by the forced sale of property, much of their property was urban, not rural.

Miguel Lerdo de Tejada, author of the Ley Lerdo, purchased disentailed church property in Veracruz for 33,000 pesos, a significant sum. Other liberals who also acquired disentailed property worth over 20,000 pesos included Ignacio Comonfort, José María Iglesias, Juan Antonio de la Fuente, and Manuel Payno. The land reform did not stimulate industrial development with capital now freed from investment in real estate and did not result in improvements in rural property since many buyers exhausted their capital on the purchase price itself. The Reform created an expanded base of urban property owners who had bought church-owned property. Since economic development remained a liberal goal, the disappointing lack of industrial development from domestic capital meant that to pursue their program, the liberals had to look to foreign investors and a situation of economic dependency.

=== Educational ===
A fundamental and lasting reform was the Mexican state's commitment to free, mandatory, public, and secular education. Schooling had been in the hands of the church and targeted male elites for training as doctors, priests, and lawyers. The liberals saw education as the way to transform the lives of Mexicans by stressing literacy and numeracy for all as a means to create better citizens. Juárez viewed education as "the cornerstone of prosperity of a people; at the same time, it is the most effective way to make abuses of power impossible." The liberals considered that the most effective way to better Mexico was to have an educated and informed citizenry, which would strengthen Mexican democracy and provide a path to upward mobility for Mexicans.

Juárez's story of being an orphaned illiterate Indigenous man rising to the presidency of Mexico was the embodiment of the power of education. When the liberals came to power, schools of any kind were few and concentrated in urban centers. The importance of education to the liberal project is indicated in Article 3 of the Constitution of 1857, embedding education as a top goal. Only after the turmoil of the Reform War and the French intervention could the liberals begin to implement the expansion of public education.

=== Social ===
The Reform created a modern nation-state, which undermined the church's institutional power. The liberals destroyed the charitable functions of the church, such as aid to the poor and hospitals. The state assumed no charitable functions at the time and abandoned the social welfare of the poor to the forces of exploitation. The Reform also destroyed the material basis of the Indigenous communities since their members no longer had access to cultivable lands, and their communities were undermined as functioning social entities. The church and the Indigenous communities continued to exist, but their power was much curtailed by the ascendancy of the liberal nation-state.

=== Political ===
The liberals were successful in creating a lasting legal framework for reforms in the Constitution of 1857. The unsuccessful conservative challenges to the Reform meant that after 1867, liberals were entirely in control. Although the liberals had hoped to create a democracy with protections for individual rights, they instead established a constitutional dictatorship under Juárez, Lerdo, and Díaz, who established political machines to ensure their continuance in power.

Historical memory in Mexico created new national heroes but prominently Juárez. Others were Melchor Ocampo, General Ignacio Zaragoza, and Miguel and Sebastián Lerdo de Tejada, Guillermo Prieto, and Vicente Riva Palacio. The winning Constitutionalist faction of the Mexican Revolution (1910-1920) fought to defend the Constitution of 1857. Once they had consolidated power, they promulgated a new constitution to remedy the problems of the Constitution of 1857 and to create a legal framework to implement revolutionary changes for which many had fought. "Political liberalism became the dominant ideology and has continued to be the 'official' ideology today."

== See also ==
- History of democracy in Mexico
- History of the Catholic Church in Mexico
