= Plan of Ayutla =

1854 plan by reformist Mexicans to remove President Santa Anna from office

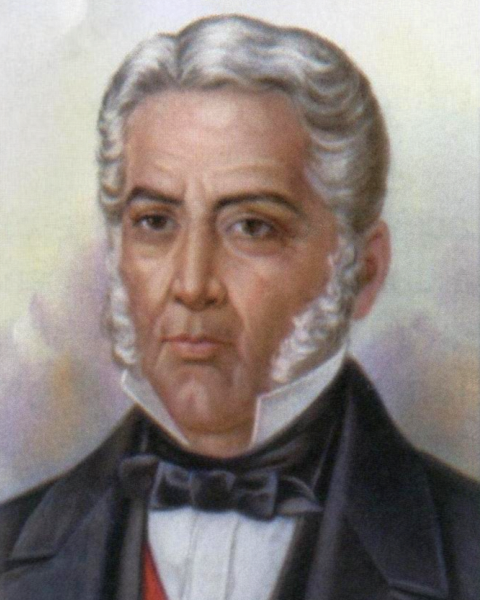
Juan Álvarez, strongman of Guerrero, was named by the Plan of Ayutla as one of three leaders of liberation forces.

The Plan of Ayutla was the 1854 written plan aimed at removing conservative, centralist President Antonio López de Santa Anna from control of Mexico during the Second Federal Republic of Mexico period. Initially, it seemed little different from other political plans of the era, but it is considered to be the first act of the Liberal Reform in Mexico. It was the catalyst for revolts in many parts of Mexico, which led to the resignation of Santa Anna from the presidency, never to vie for office again. The next Presidents of Mexico were the liberals, Juan Álvarez, Ignacio Comonfort, and Benito Juárez. The new regime would then proclaim the 1857 Mexican Constitution, which implemented a variety of liberal reforms.

== Dissent against the Santa Anna dictatorship ==
After Mexico's defeat in the Mexican–American War, the country was beset by despair and political chaos. Abhorring long-term exploitation and short-term heavy taxes needed to finance the war, some indigenous peoples revolted in the Sierra Gorda region (1847–1849) and in the Yucatán peninsula (1847–1852). The north of Mexico was especially devastated. The territorial losses to the United States codified in the Treaty of Guadalupe Hidalgo were an impetus for Apache and Comanche raids in northern Mexico. The region was further weakened by depopulation, with the discovery of gold in the recently lost territory of California prompting inhabitants of northern Mexico to migrate there.

During this chaos, José María Tornel and Juan Suárez y Navarro founded the Santanista party. The Santanistas believed that Mexico should be ruled by a strong dictator who would create a centralized state that would emphasize the importance of the Catholic faith. Conservative politician and historian Lucas Alamán stated that the Church was "the only tie left that unites the Mexican people." The Santanistas hoped that exiled President Santa Anna would be that strong dictator. The Santanistas, with help from the radical puros and the military, overthrew the moderado Mariano Arista. Santa Anna arrived in Veracruz on 1 April 1853, and he took office upon reaching Mexico City on 20 April.

Upon taking office yet again, Santa Anna took measures to improve the army, hoping to create a standing army of 90,000 men. However, due to the unpopularity of the draft and the low quality of the troops who were recruited, Santa Anna lowered his goal to 46,000 troops. Mexican Liberals whom Santa Anna considered threats, notably Benito Juárez and Melchor Ocampo, were forced into exile to the U.S. Juárez and Ocampo settled in New Orleans and plotted to overthrow the government. Santa Anna also introduced tax increases to boost revenue. On 14 May 1853, a decree was promulgated that renewed all taxes and added new ones, such as the restoration of the alcabala (sales tax) and the abolition of financial concessions to the port of Acapulco and to Yucatán. Santa Anna had some successful policies, such as measures that reduced banditry and improved the country's highway system. However, he became increasingly authoritarian as well as pompous, adopting the title of "Most Serene Highness." His popularity also declined due to the tax increases that he implemented, his suppression of political opposition, and his regime's rampant corruption. A key event that further decreased his popularity was the Gadsden Purchase, in which the United States paid $10,000,000 to Mexico in exchange for more Mexican land. It has been speculated that Santa Anna took $600,000 of the indemnity for himself. Santa Anna was further weakened by the deaths of many advisors and the alienation of others, as exemplified by his decision to exile Suárez y Navarro.

== Plan of Ayutla is drafted ==
By the beginning of 1854, Santa Anna had secured control over most of Mexico. The southern state of Guerrero, which was ruled by General Juan Álvarez, remained outside of his control. Due to its difficult terrain, the state was naturally shielded from the capital. Álvarez was angered by Santa Anna's pro-Spanish policies, such as hiring Spanish mercenaries, and by the central government's confiscation of Guerrero's public lands. The government also planned to build a highway from Mexico City to Acapulco, which threatened Álvarez's regional autonomy. Angered by Álvarez's disloyal behavior, Santa Anna sent General Pérez Palacios to seize Acapulco, and Álvarez similarly prepared for war.

Colonel Ignacio Comonfort, one of Álvarez's subordinates, pressed for a plan to be written, as he wanted to win over public opinion and to add an idealistic angle to the planned rebellion. He wanted the document to be vague and to avoid any topics that would narrow the movement's appeal. Initially drafted on 24 February 1854, by Colonel Florencio Villarreal, it was proclaimed on 1 March 1854, in Ayutla, Guerrero. The Plan de Ayutla was influenced by a document written by the New Orleans exiles. The Ayutla Plan not only aimed at removing the dictator but also convening a constituent assembly in order to draft a federal constitution. The Plan charged Santa Anna with being a tyrant and declared the Gadsden Purchase to be illegal. The authors promised to end the draft and the poll tax. Álvarez, Tomás Moreno, and Nicolás Bravo were declared to be the military leaders of the insurgency, and they were given the power to alter the plan if necessary. Álvarez and Comonfort did not support this proclamation publicly, as Comonfort believed that it would not gain support among moderados. The Plan was then slightly revised and accepted by the rebel leaders on 13 March.

The notable supporters of the Plan of Ayutla included Pedro Hinojosa, Juan Álvarez, exiles of the Santa Anna regime Benito Juárez, Melchor Ocampo, José María Mata, and Ponciano Arriaga, as well as Ignacio Comonfort, Miguel Lerdo de Tejada, Sebastián Lerdo de Tejada, and José María Jesús Carbajal.

== Revolution of Ayutla ==
Revolution of Ayutla
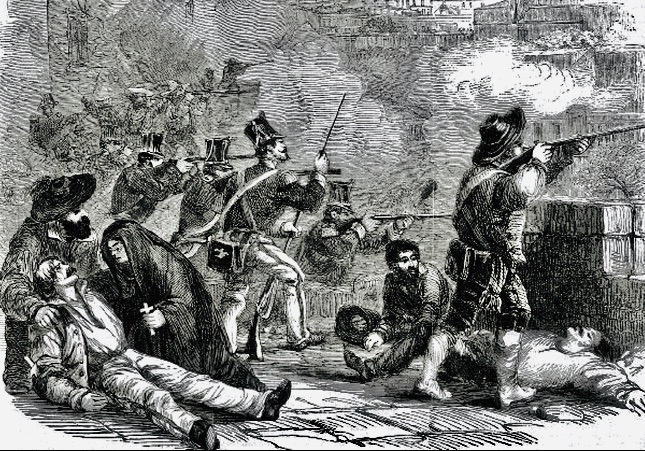
- Battle during the revolution
Date	1 March 1854 – 12 August 1855 (1 year, 5 months, 1 week and 4 days)
Location	Mexico
Result	Revolutionary victory; Santa Anna is ousted and exiled.; Beginning of La Reforma and the Reform laws by the liberals.; Constituent congress convened to draft a new constitution.

Belligerents
(Mexico) Revolutionaries	(Mexico) Santanistas

Commanders and leaders
Juan Álvarez; Ignacio Comonfort	Antonio López de Santa Anna; Félix María Zuloaga

Álvarez's forces initiated 19 months of guerrilla warfare and civil unrest against Santa Anna. The rebels were aided by the exiles in New Orleans, who sent them weapons. This uprising is termed the Revolution of Ayutla (1854−1855), since it entailed not just a narrow political goal of ousting the dictator, but a more thorough change in political direction via armed warfare. The Revolution of Ayutla brought a new generation of younger men into active national political life, a "generation of giants" including military men: Comonfort, Santiago Vidaurri, Epitacio Huerta, and Manuel García Pueblita; as well as radical liberal intellectuals, Ocampo, Arriaga, Guillermo Prieto, and Juárez. In the summer of 1855, Juárez returned to Acapulco from exile to serve as a political ally of Álvarez.

Alvarez had success in mobilizing forces in Guerrero, many of which had formed paramilitary units during the U.S. - Mexican War (1846-1848), Santa Anna decided to crush the rebellion in person, leaving Mexico City with an army on 16 March 1854. Santa Anna's federal army defeated the "Liberating Army" at El Coquillo. He then arrived at Acapulco on 19 April, but the rebels cut his communications with Mexico City, and he learned that Comonfort had fortified the city. After a week long siege, Santa Anna was forced to retreat. On 30 April, Santa Anna defeated Moreno at el Pelegrino, but the rebels inflicted severe losses on Santa Anna's army, and Santa Anna himself was almost captured. During the retreat to Mexico City, Santa Anna's army executed rebel prisoners and burned villages. There followed uprisings in the states of Michoacán, Morelos, Oaxaca, and Mexico state. The rebellion then spread to the northern states of Zacatecas, San Luis Potosí, and Nuevo León. The irregular forces of the liberal side took a few months' time off from the revolution to attend to their crops.

The war continued without major battles or decisive victories. The government's most significant success was Colonel Félix Zuloaga's victory at El Limón on 22 July. However, the rebellion proved impossible to suppress and, on 18 January 1855, Zuloaga surrendered after being besieged at Tecpan. By April, the rebels were making progress in most parts of Mexico, but especially in Michoacán, which prompted Santa Anna to lead one last offensive into that province on 30 April 1855. The rebels retreated instead of engaging Santa Anna's army, and, unable to crush them, he eventually returned to Mexico City. When Mexico City denounced Santa Anna, he abdicated on 12 August 1855 and fled into exile. Álvarez's forces marched into the capital with a "brigade of rustics called Pintos (ferocious warriors so called because in earlier times, they wore face paint). In the capital there was widespread popular support for the Revolution of Ayutla, with people gathering in the Parque Alameda and waiting hours to sign a document in support of Mexico City for the revolution. Álvarez then assumed the office of President of Mexico. Once the rebels occupied Mexico City, they confiscated all of Santa Anna's property so as to recoup the indemnity from the Gadsden Purchase that Santa Anna's regime had squandered.

== Aftermath ==
The Plan paved the way for La Reforma (the Liberal Reform). The Revolution of Ayutla brought its liberals to power. Their leaders initially passed a series of reform laws, notably the Juárez Law, the Lerdo Law and the Iglesias Law. These laws were explicitly anticlerical. The Juárez Law abolished special courts for groups such as the military and the clergy. The Lerdo Law sought to replace corporate ownership of land with individual ownership of land, and it confiscated Church lands. The Iglesias Law sought to control the costs of Church administered sacraments.

Soon afterward, Comonfort, who had succeeded Álvarez as President, convened a Congress to draft a new Constitution. The most contentious topic was the possibility of including a provision that would guarantee religious toleration, that is abolish the religious monopoly of the Catholic Church, with puros supporting such a measure and moderados opposing it. The moderados opposed the measure with arguments attacking Protestantism and arguments that religious toleration would harm the family and national cohesion. Other moderados argued that Constitutions should avoid idealism and reflect the country's populace. Eventually, the moderados would prevent the inclusion of a religious toleration provision, and they would also prevent a trial by jury provision from being included in the Constitution. However, the Juárez Law, the Lerdo Law, and the Iglesias Law were incorporated into the 1857 Mexican Constitution. The Congress also added many other liberal stipulations, such as freedom of thought, freedom of the press, freedom of petition, and numerous laws defending the rights of those being prosecuted, such as the right to appeal, the right of a defendant to access material so as to craft a defense, and the abolition of double jeopardy. The new Constitution also reaffirmed the abolition of slavery, which had been in effect since 1829.

Objecting to the new Constitution's anticlerical elements, Pope Pius IX opposed it. Domestic Conservatives and the Mexican Catholic Church also opposed La Reforma and the 1857 Constitution in the Plan of Tacubaya. This would soon prompt an open civil war, known as the War of the Reform or Three Years' War (1858−1860).

== See also ==
- Plans in Mexican history
- Liberalism in Mexico
- List of wars involving Mexico
- Second Federal Republic of Mexico period
