= Miguel Lerdo de Tejada =

19th-century Mexican statesman and reformist politician

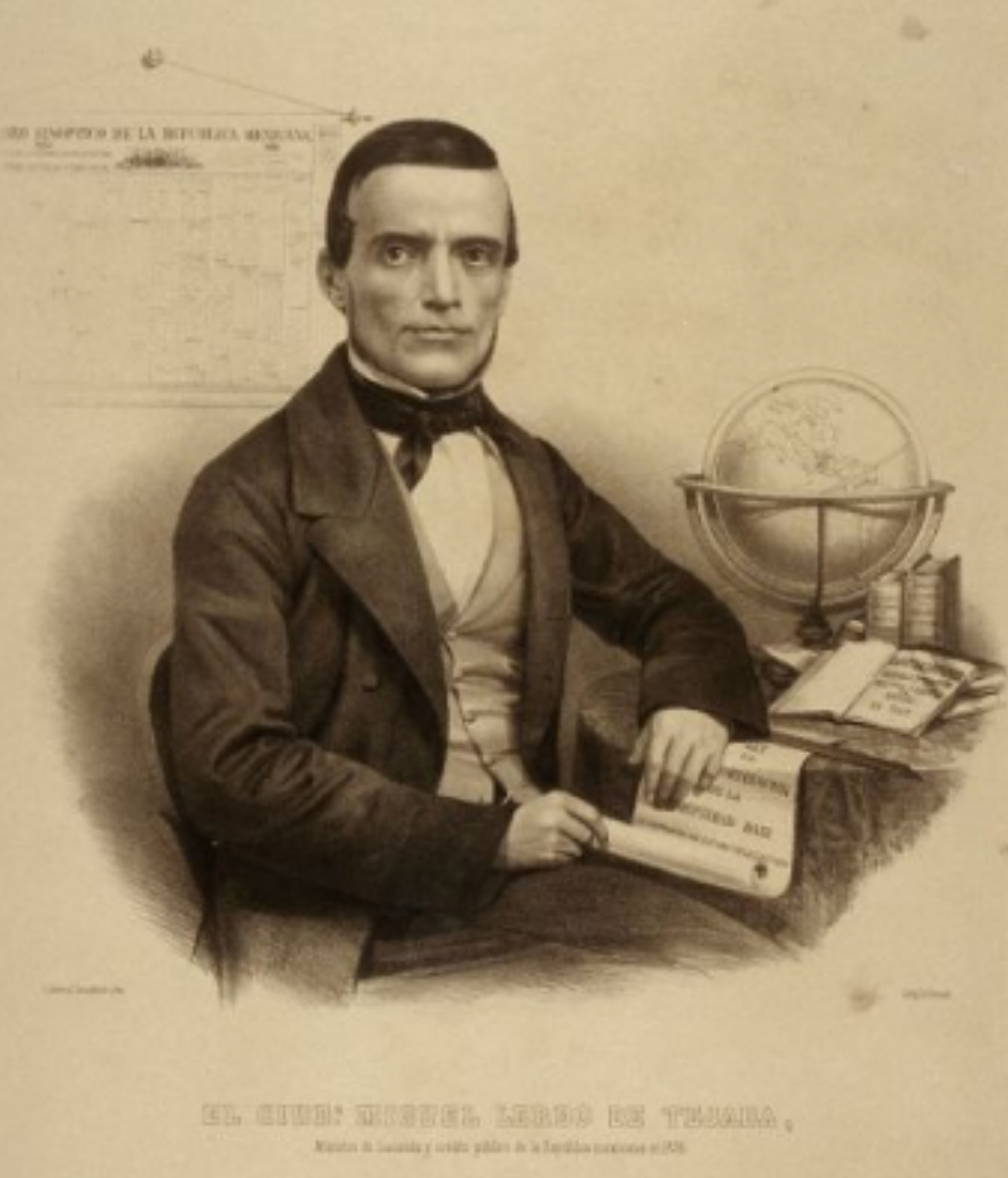
Miguel Lerdo de Tejada drafted the law to disentail the lands of the Catholic Church and those of indigenous communities. The Lerdo Law was codified in the Liberal Constitution of 1857.

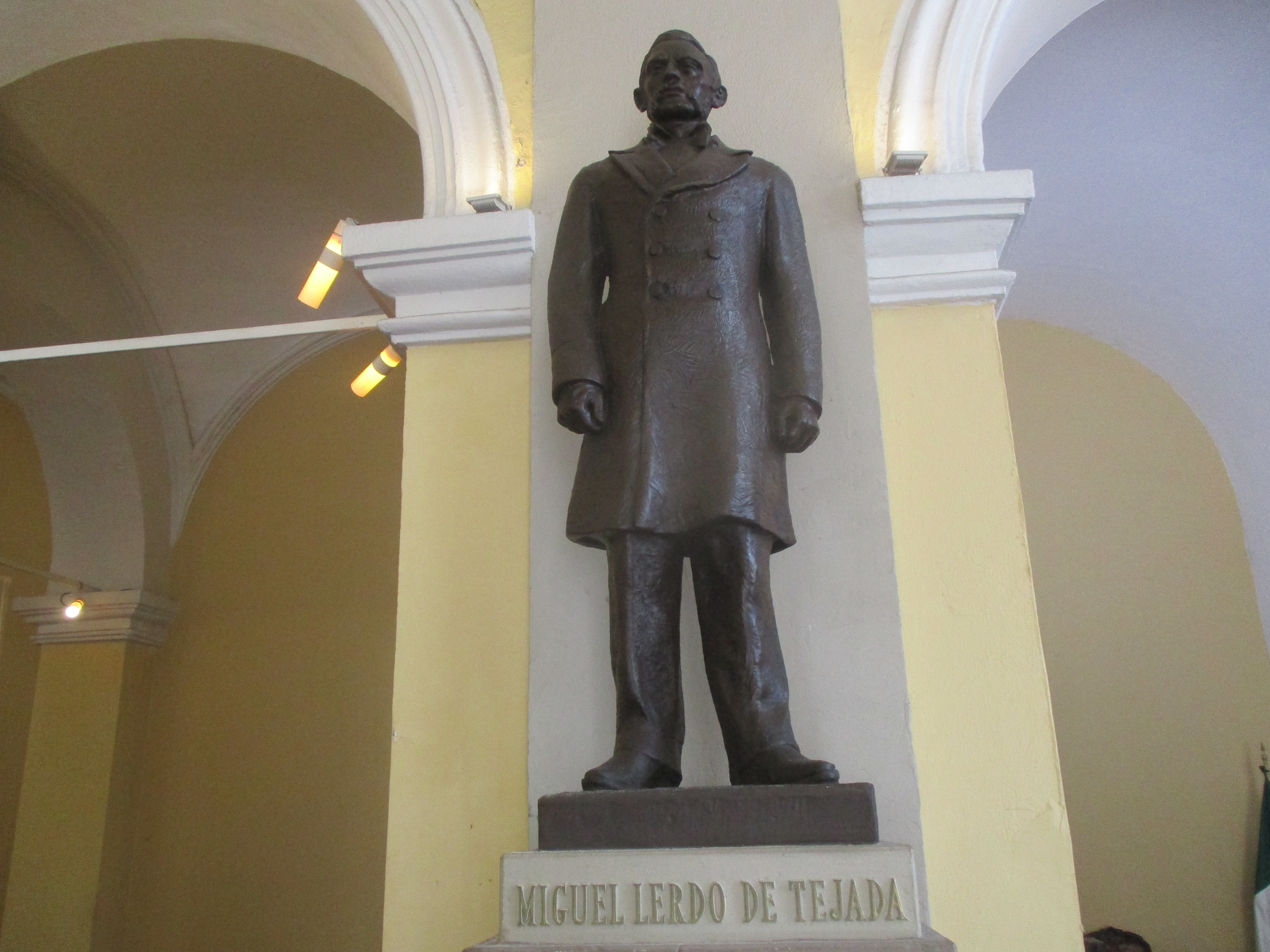
Monument in Veracruz

Miguel Lerdo de Tejada (July 6, 1812 – March 22, 1861) was a Mexican statesman, a leader of the Revolution of Ayutla, and author of the Lerdo Law, extinguishing the right of corporations, including the Roman Catholic Church and indigenous communities, from holding land.

Born in the port of Veracruz, Veracruz, both he and his younger brother, Sebastián Lerdo de Tejada, became leaders of Mexico's Liberal Party. As the president of the ayuntamiento (city council) of Mexico City in 1852, Miguel Lerdo de Tejada proposed initiatives on public education, transportation, public health, and budgetary reforms. Lerdo served Antonio López de Santa Anna in his final term as president (1853–55) and then as the Treasury Secretary under liberal president Ignacio Comonfort following the successful implementation of the Plan de Ayutla. In 1856, Miguel Lerdo de Tejada initiated the Ley de Desamortización de Fincas Rústicas y Urbanas (Disentailment of Rural and Urban Properties Law), commonly known as the Ley Lerdo, which called for the forced sale of most properties held by the Roman Catholic Church in Mexico, common lands of indigenous communities, and by municipal and state governments. The Church could retain only the buildings it used for its operations (churches, monasteries, seminary buildings); governments could keep only government offices, jails, and school buildings. Other property, which had been used to generate income for the Church and for local governments, was to be sold with the proceeds going into the national treasury. Because of the disruptions of the War of Reform (1858 - 1861) and the French Intervention (1862 - 1867) that wracked Mexico, few properties were actually sold as a direct result of the Ley Lerdo. Most of the "disruptions" attributed to that law actually occurred later, under legislation passed during the regime of Porfirio Díaz (1876 - 1911), but took their legal foundation in the Ley Lerdo.

Miguel Lerdo de Tejada resigned from his position as Treasury Secretary when Comonfort's successor, Benito Juárez, rejected Lerdo's proposal to suspend the payment of Mexico's foreign debt. Lerdo had attempted to negotiate foreign loans using confiscated church property as collateral to fund the liberal side of the War of the Reform, but was unsuccessful. He returned to Mexico City with the victorious Liberal government at the conclusion of the War of the Reform on January 1, 1861, and took up his elected post as a member of the Supreme Court. He campaigned against Juárez in 1861 for the presidency, but he died of typhus on March 22, 1861.

== See also ==
- La Reforma
- Liberalism in Mexico
