= Liberalism in Mexico =

Aspect of Mexican political history

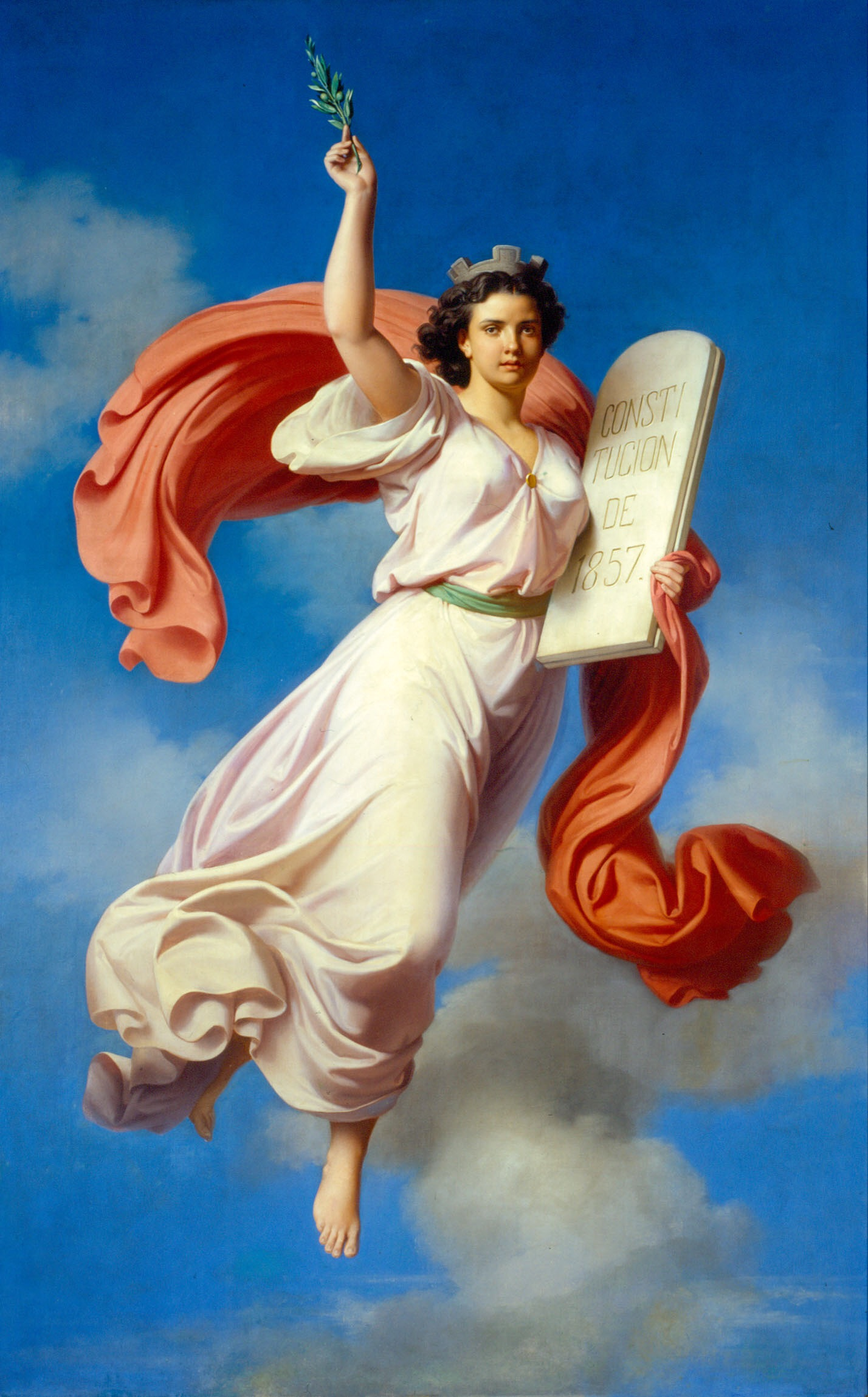
Alegoría de la Constitución de 1857 Petronilo Monroy 1867.

Liberalism in Mexico was part of a broader nineteenth-century political trend affecting Western Europe and the Americas, including the United States, that challenged entrenched power. In Mexico, liberalism sought to make fundamental the equality of individuals before the law, rather than their benefiting from special privileges of corporate entities, especially the Roman Catholic Church, the military, and indigenous communities. Liberalism viewed universal, free, secular education as the means to transform Mexico's citizenry.

Early nineteenth-century liberals promoted the idea of economic development in the overwhelmingly rural country where much land was owned by the Catholic Church and held in common by indigenous communities to create a large class of yeoman farmers. Liberals passed a series of individual Reform laws and then wrote a new constitution in 1857 to give full force to the changes. Liberalism in Mexico "was not only a political philosophy of republicanism but a package including democratic social values, free enterprise, a legal bundle of civil rights to protect individualism, and a group consciousness of nationalism." Mexican liberalism is most closely associated with anticlericalism. Mexican liberals looked to the U.S. as their model for development and actively sought the support of the U.S., while Mexican conservatives looked to Europe.

== History ==
=== Nineteenth-century Mexican liberalism ===
The term "liberal" became the name of a political faction, which previously had called itself "the Party of Progress" in contrast to the Conservative Party, which they called "the Party of Regression." Conservatives characterized themselves as those that defended Mexican tradition of the colonial era. Following Mexican independence from Spain in 1821, the first Mexican liberals became important on the national scene. The most prominent was secular priest and intellectual, José María Luis Mora (1794–1850), who was influenced by Montesquieu, Benjamin Constant, and Jeremy Bentham. Mora attacked corporate privilege, especially the fueros of the Roman Catholic Church; considered the role of utilitarianism (the greatest good for the greatest number) in Mexico; examined the so-called "Indian Question," of how to modernize Mexico when the majority of the population was indigenous living in rural communities; and considered the role of liberalism in economic development. Lorenzo de Zavala was another prominent liberal of that generation, but he sided with Anglo-Texan rebels in their successful war for independence, with Zavala subsequently considered a traitor to Mexico. The early post-independence era was dominated by General Antonio López de Santa Anna and Mexican conservatives, who were more effective in forming an ideologically unified political force, so that Mexican liberals were rarely able to exercise political power nationally.

Most Mexican liberals looked to European thinkers in their formulation of their ideology, which has led to a debate about whether those ideas were merely "Mexicanized" versions. In practice in Mexico, liberals viewed the U.S. political and economic system as a model for Mexico, and actively sought U.S. aid when they came to power in 1855, when the liberal Revolution of Ayutla forced conservative strongman Antonio López de Santa Anna into exile. In Mexico, the most salient aspects of nineteenth-century liberalism were to create a secular state separated from the Roman Catholic Church, establish equality before the law by abolishing corporate privileges (fueros) of the Catholic church, the military, both of which had their own courts, and indigenous communities, which held land in common. Liberals' aim was to transform Mexico into a modern secular state with a dynamic economy. Corporate privilege and the conservative elite defenders were considered stumbling blocks to the nation's political, social, and economic progress. Secular, public education was a key element in opening paths to achievement for all Mexican citizens. Schooling historically had been the domain of the Roman Catholic Church and limited to elite men, so that broadening educational access and having a secular curriculum was seen as a way to transform Mexican society. The breakup of land owned by corporations, specifically the Roman Catholic Church and indigenous communities, was a crucial policy element in diminishing the power of the church and integrating Mexico's Indians into the republic as citizens and transforming them into yeoman farmers. Unlike many liberals elsewhere, Mexican liberals did not call for limitations on executive power, but early Mexican liberals were largely federalists who wanted considerable power reserved for the states and not the central government.

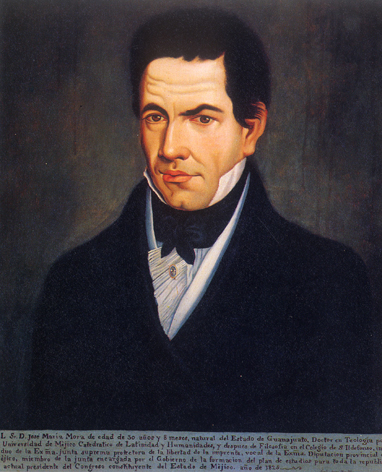
José María Luis Mora (1794–1850), first major liberal intellectual of independent Mexico.

With Mexico's defeat in the Mexican–American War (1846–48), a new generation of what historian Enrique Krauze calls "romantic liberals" emerged. They were rooted in literature, and read and translated European writers such as Lamartine, Michelet, Byron, Victor Hugo and Alexandre Dumas. Outstanding among these Mexican liberals were Ignacio Ramírez (1818–1879); Guillermo Prieto (1818–1897); and Ignacio Manuel Altamirano (1834–1893), who was of indigenous Nahua origin and rose to be a major literary figure and journalist. These intellectuals lived through and tried to shape political thought in the War of the Reform between conservatives and liberals, and the Second French intervention, a foreign intervention supported by Mexican conservatives.

Pragmatic politicians, preeminently Benito Juárez, born in a Zapotec village in Oaxaca, as well as Miguel Lerdo de Tejada, his brother Sebastián Lerdo de Tejada, and Melchor Ocampo aimed at transforming liberal ideas into legislation and reform. They were all guided by liberal principles and fought for them. Liberals enacted reform laws to curtail the power of the Church and the army in the Juárez Law (1856) and undermined the Church's economic power with the 1856 Lerdo Law, which prohibited corporations—the Roman Catholic Church, as well as indigenous communities—for holding title to land. In 1857, liberals drafted and promulgated a new constitution and required Mexicans to take an oath of fealty to it. Many in the army opposed the Liberal Reform and the Catholic hierarchy in November 1857 forbade Catholics from taking the oath or face ex-communication. Moderate liberal politician, Ignacio Comonfort sought to forge a middle ground when General Félix Zuloaga promulgated the Plan of Tacubaya, which declared the liberal constitution nullified, but allowed President Comonfort to retain his office and with enhanced powers. Comonfort signed onto the plan and many liberals were jailed, including Juárez. When it quickly became clear that Comonfort's hope to chart a middle course between conservatives and liberals had failed, he resigned from the presidency after freeing the jailed liberals. Benito Juárez had been head of the Supreme Court and with Comonfort's resignation, he succeeded to the presidency as Mexico was plunged into civil war.

With the ouster of the French in 1867 and the discrediting of Mexican conservatives who had supported the regime of foreign monarch Maximilian I of Mexico, Juárez, and his successor following his death of natural causes in 1872, Sebastián Lerdo de Tejada could implement the Reform laws passed in the 1850s. With religious toleration mandated, the Roman Catholic Church was no longer the sole spiritual institution in Mexico; it was excluded from its former role as the only educators of the nation; and its economic power was diminished.

With that major liberal victory won, a third generation of liberals emerged during the presidency of liberal general and military hero of the Second French intervention in Mexico, Porfirio Díaz (r. 1876–1911). During the Porfiriato, a new group of liberals in name only, the "científicos," were influenced by the Positivism of French philosopher Auguste Comte, and Saint-Simon, scientist Charles Darwin, and Herbert Spencer, known for social Darwinism. Historian and educator Justo Sierra was the most prolific and influential of this group surrounding Díaz. A group of Mexican politicians supporting the increasingly dictatorial Díaz regime characterized themselves as the Cientificos, "scientists". Díaz's supporters became comfortable with a strong executive, traditionally associated with conservative ideology, as a pragmatic means to achieve stability and ensure economic growth. Under Díaz, a modus vivendi with the Roman Catholic Church emerged whereby it regained a portion of its power and influence, but the anticlerical articles of the Constitution of 1857 remained theoretically enforced.

=== Liberalism in the 20th century ===
Political button for the Mexican Liberal Party, which sought the end of the Díaz regime.

As the Díaz regime became increasingly dictatorial and trampled on the rights and liberties of Mexicans, a group of Mexican oppositionists led by Camilo Arriaga and Ricardo Flores Magón formed the Mexican Liberal Party (PLM). It called for the overthrow of Díaz and agitated for the rights of workers and peasants and for economic nationalism favoring Mexicans rather than foreigners. The PLM had two basic factions, one was reformist and was supported by elite, urban intellectuals and the other was anarcho-communist and advocated revolution. As the opposition to Díaz grew, Liberal clubs met secretly in Mexican cities to discuss politics, which led to the First Liberal Congress that met in San Luis Potosí in 1901. Radicals, such as Flores Magón, were exiled to the United States and drafted the Liberal Party program in 1905. A reformist liberal, rich hacienda owner Francisco I. Madero founded the Anti-Reelectionist Party and ran against Díaz in the 1910 presidential elections. He garnered support from PLM members in the campaign. The fraudulent 1910 elections sparked revolts throughout many parts of the country, considered the outbreak of the Mexican Revolution, and Díaz was forced to resign.

At the outbreak of the uprising against Díaz, the opposition pointed to his continued re-election and abrogation of the liberal Constitution of 1857. Francisco Madero was brought to power by revolutionary forces, but he had hoped to proceed via the constitutional path with election. With the ouster of Díaz, his resignation and exile, Madero agreed to an interim government until new elections could be held in fall 1911. He won the presidency overwhelmingly. He lifted censorship of the press, suppression of strikes, and other measures that Díaz had employed to keep dissent in check. Madero was overthrown in a military coup in February 1913. A broad coalition of opposition to the new government formed itself as the Constitutionalist Army, invoking the Constitution of 1857. That faction was victorious in the Mexican Revolution under the leadership of former Governor of Coahuila Venustiano Carranza. Carranza sought legitimacy for his regime and called for a constitutional convention, which excluded the defeated factions of the revolution. What Carranza envisioned to be a tune-up of the 1857 charter instead was a new constitution, the Constitution of 1917, which remains in force.

== Major liberal leaders ==
- José María Luis Mora – Vicente Guerrero – Melchor Ocampo – Valentín Gómez Farías – Benito Juárez – Juan Álvarez – Guillermo Prieto – Miguel Lerdo de Tejada – Sebastián Lerdo de Tejada – Ignacio Manuel Altamirano – Porfirio Díaz – José Yves Limantour – Justo Sierra – Francisco I. Madero - José María Pino Suárez - Gustavo A. Madero

== Gallery of liberal leaders ==
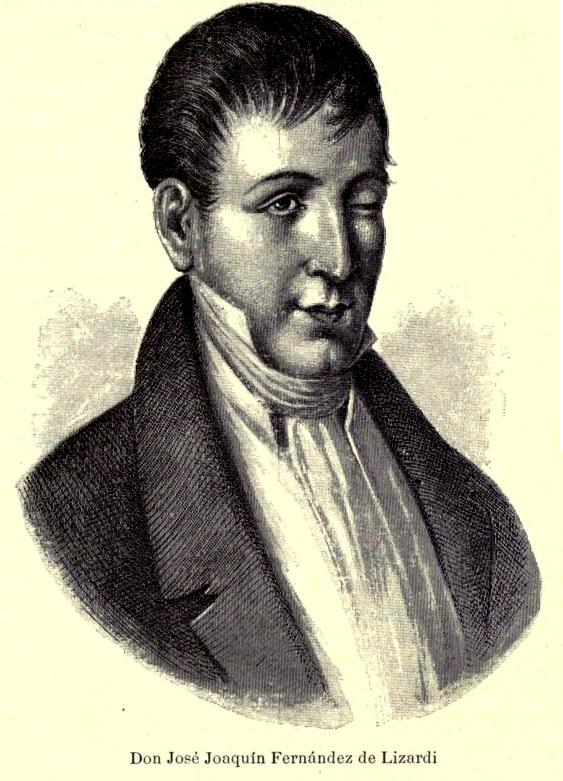
Fernández de Lizardi (1776–1827)

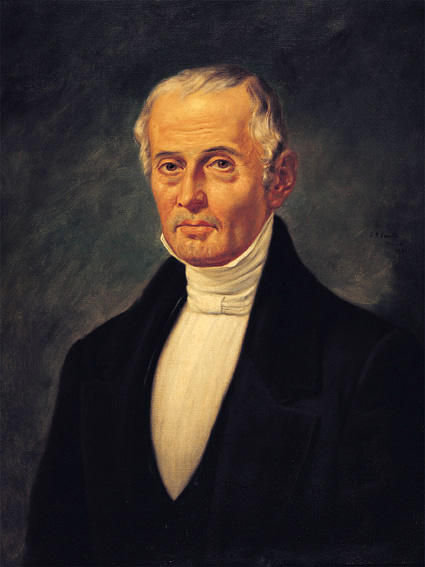
Valentín Gómez Farías (1781–1858)

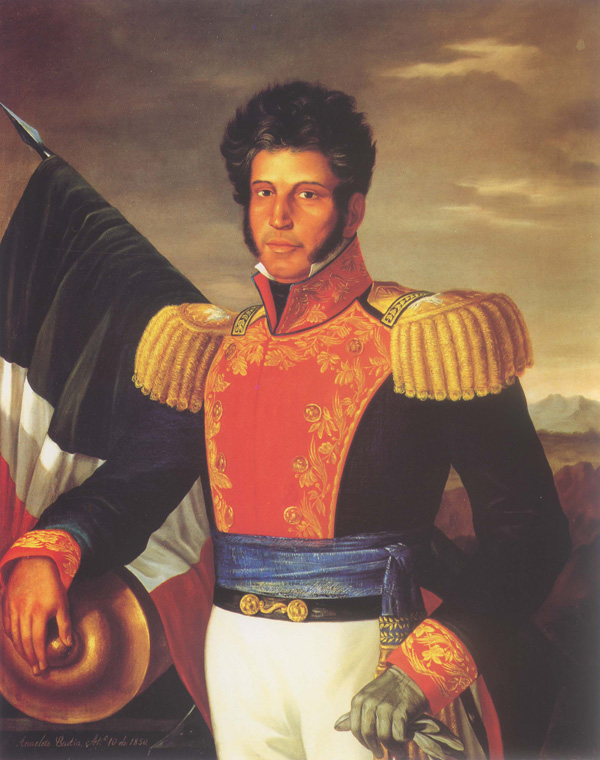
Vicente Guerrero (1782–1831)

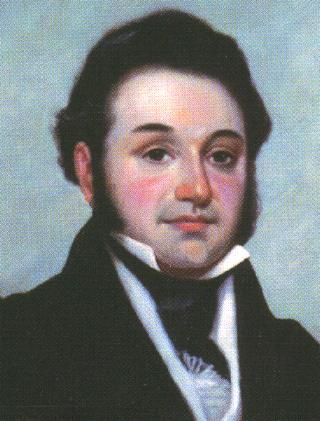
Lorenzo de Zavala (1788–1836)

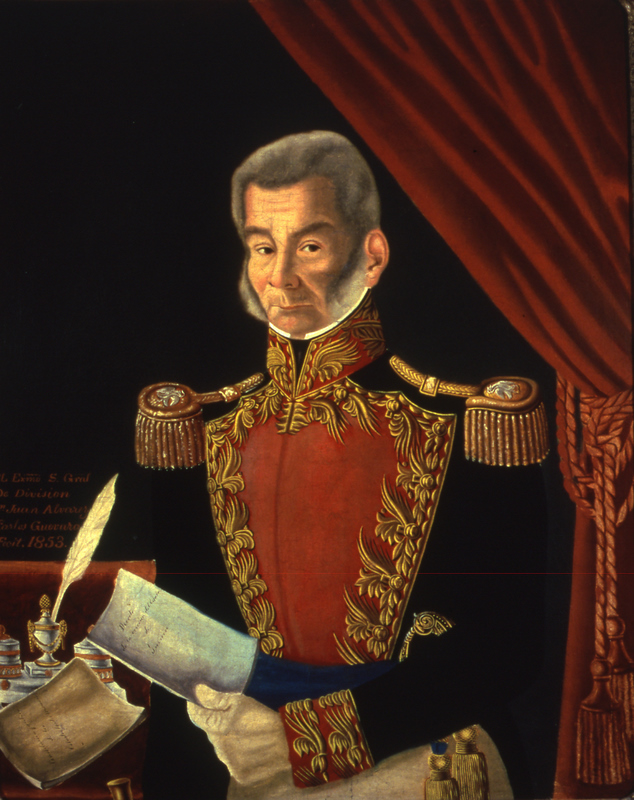
Juan Álvarez (1790–1867)

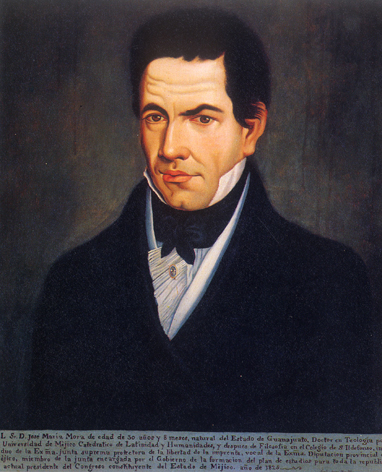
José María Luis Mora (1794–1850)

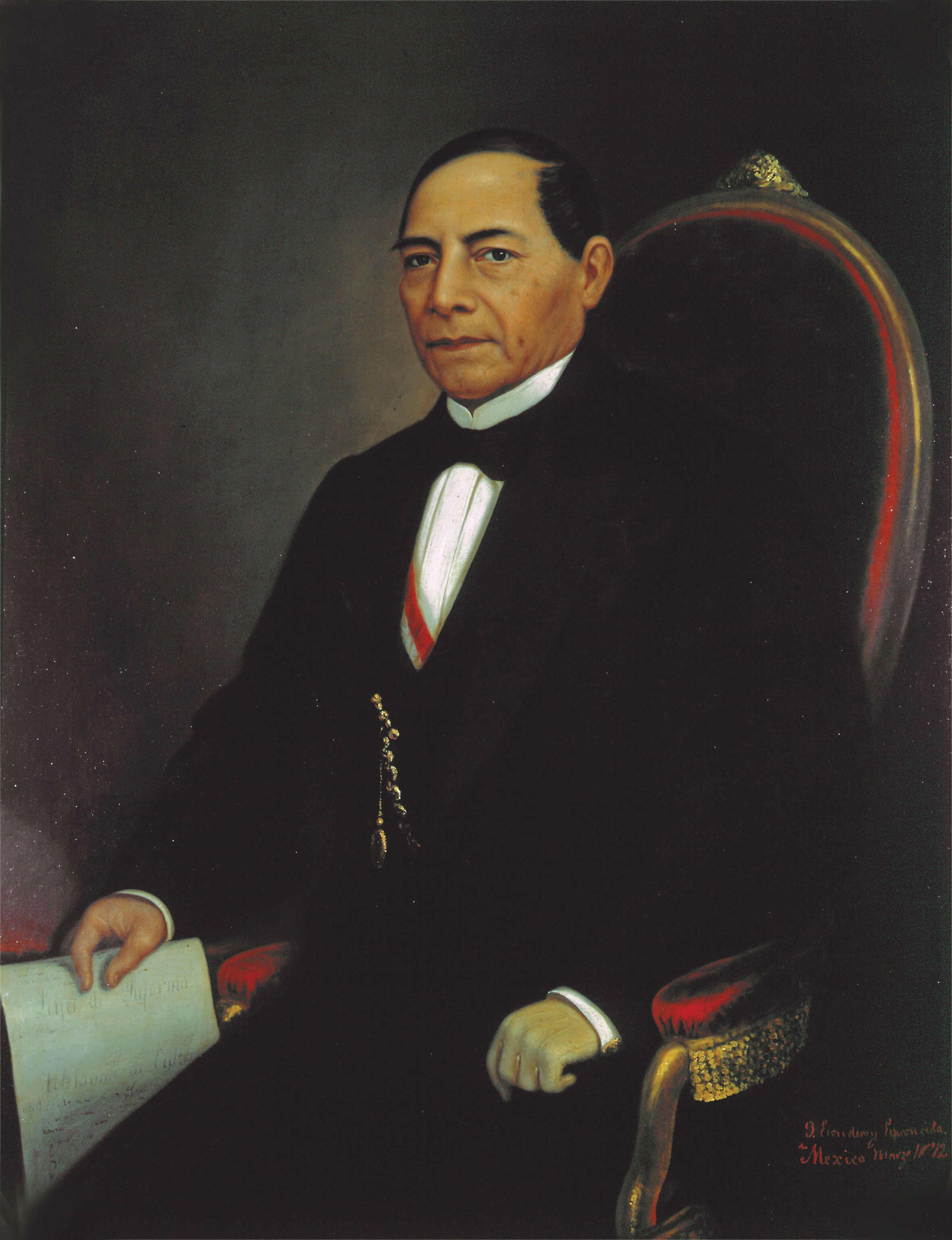
Benito Juárez (1806–1872)

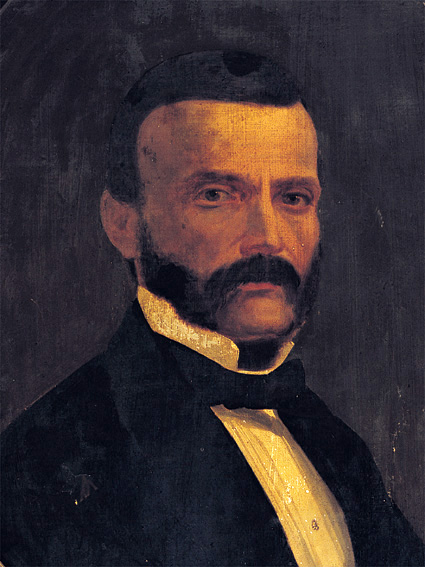
Miguel Lerdo de Tejada (1812–1861)

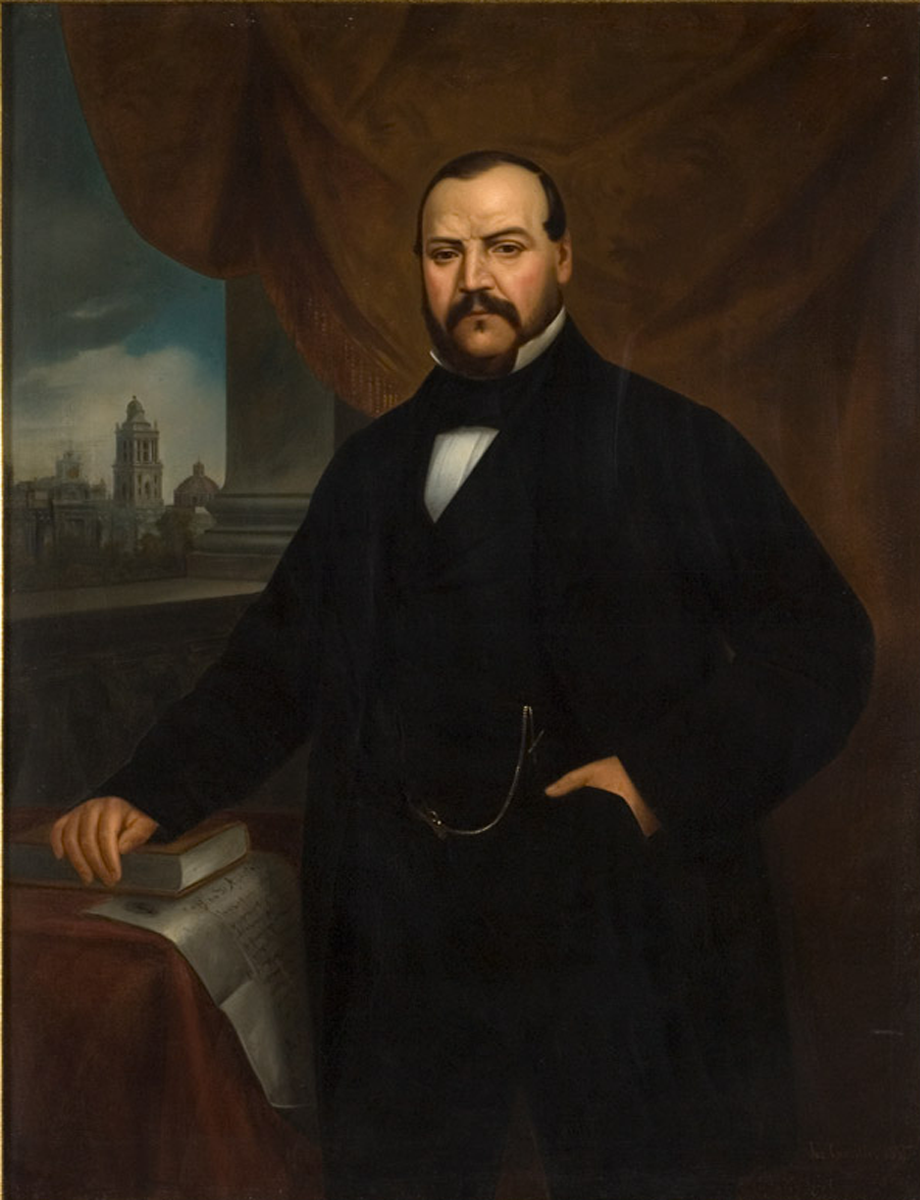
Ignacio Comonfort (1812–1863)

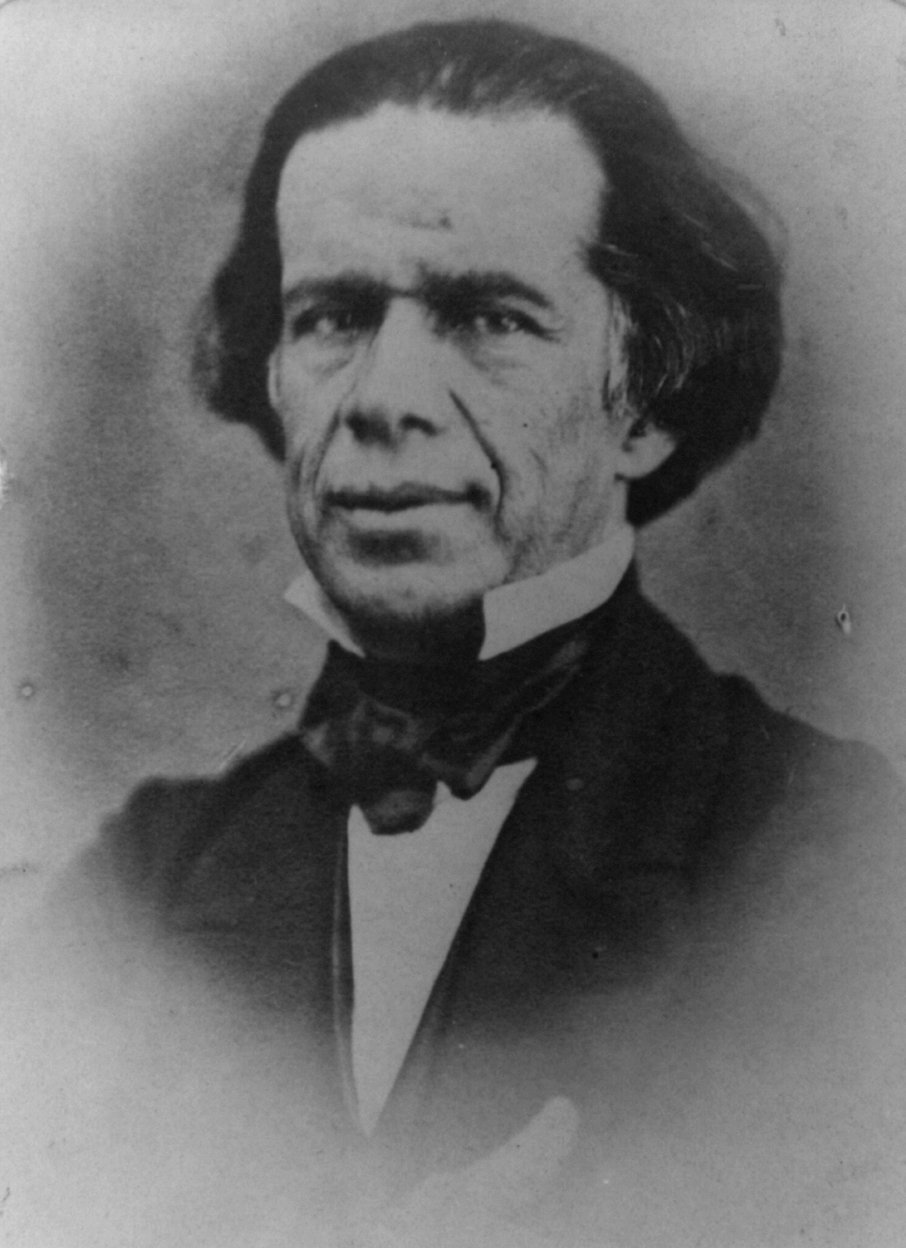
Melchor Ocampo (1814–1861)

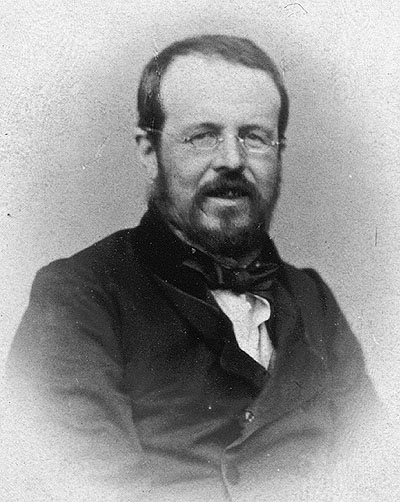
Guillermo Prieto (1818–1897)

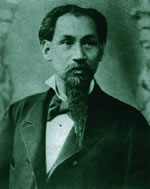
Ignacio Ramírez (1818–1879)

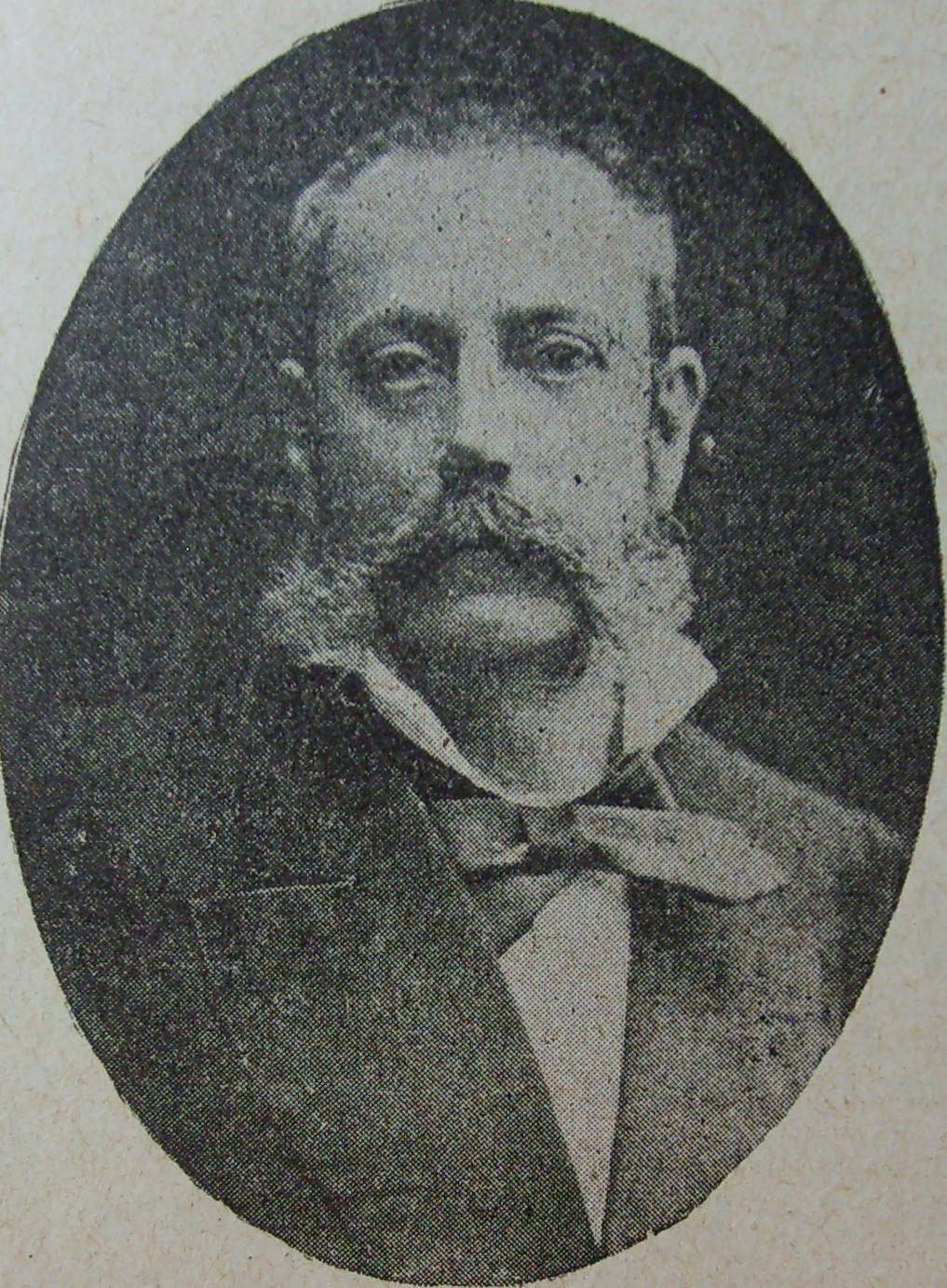
Gabino Barreda (1818–1881)

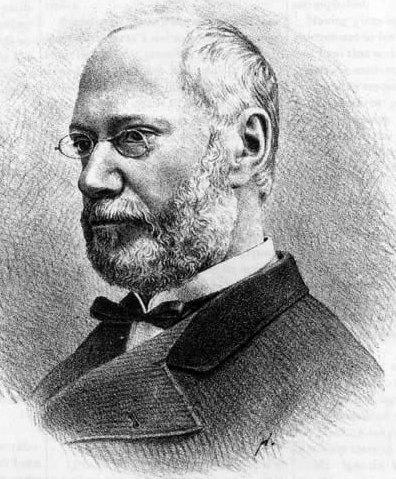
José María Iglesias (1823–1891)

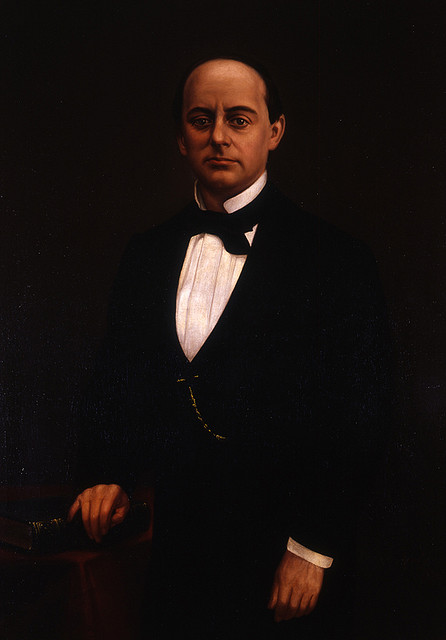
Sebastián Lerdo de Tejada (1823–1889)

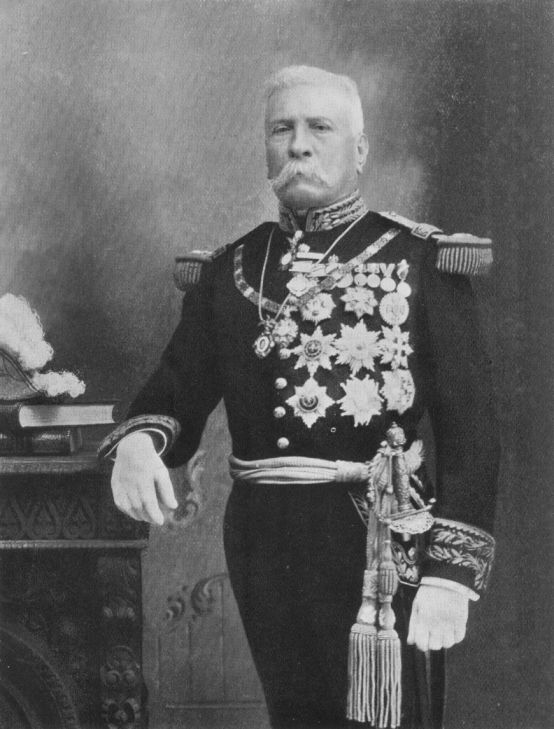
Porfirio Díaz (1830–1915)

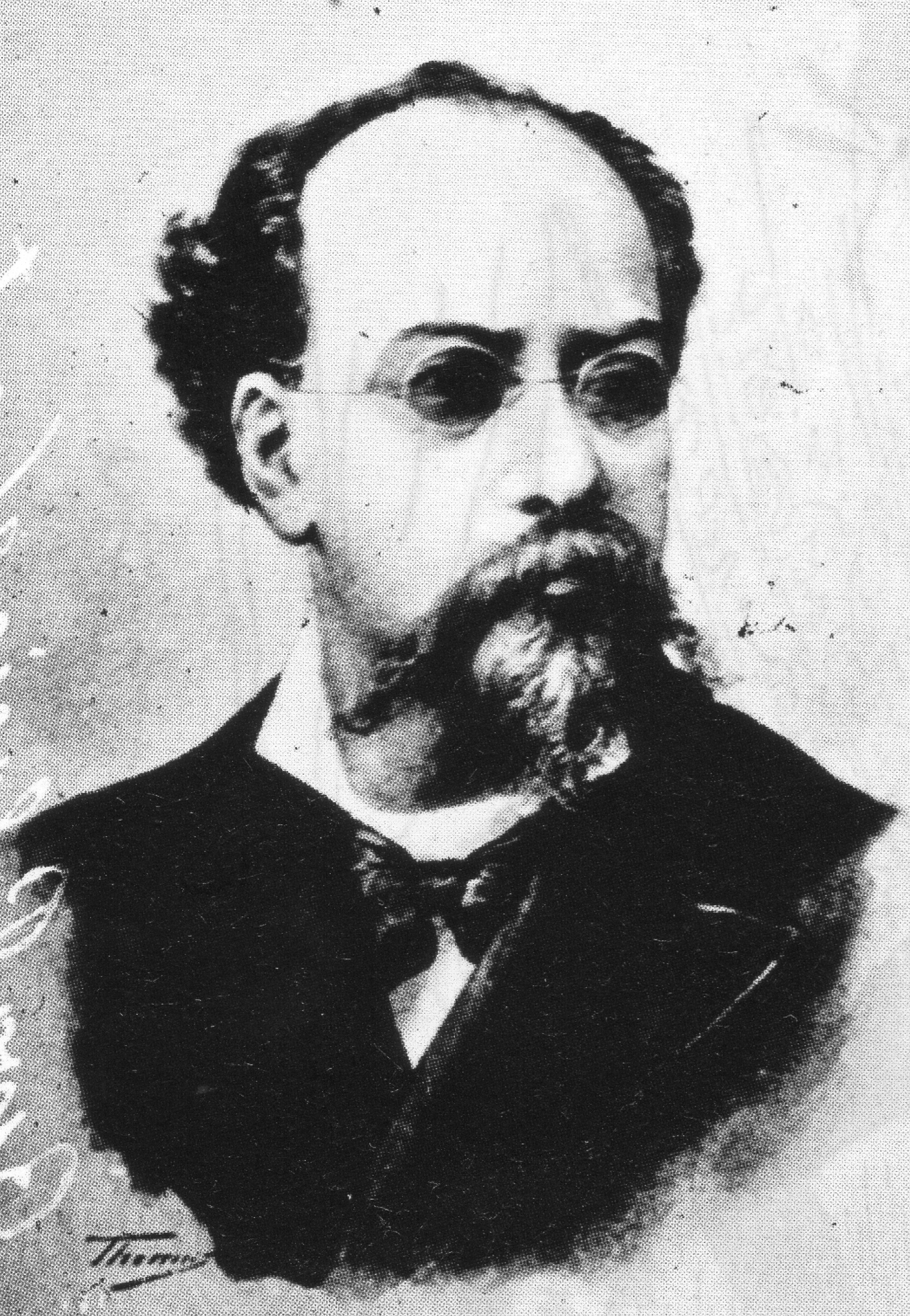
Vicente Riva Palacio (1832–1896)

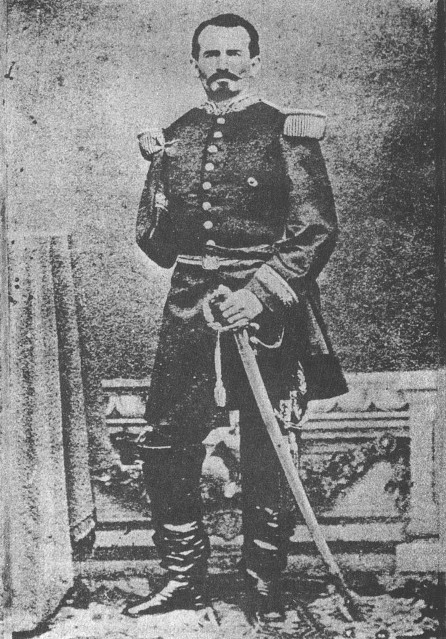
Manuel González (1833–1893)

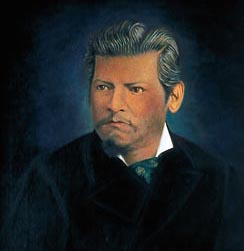
Ignacio Altamirano (1834–1893)

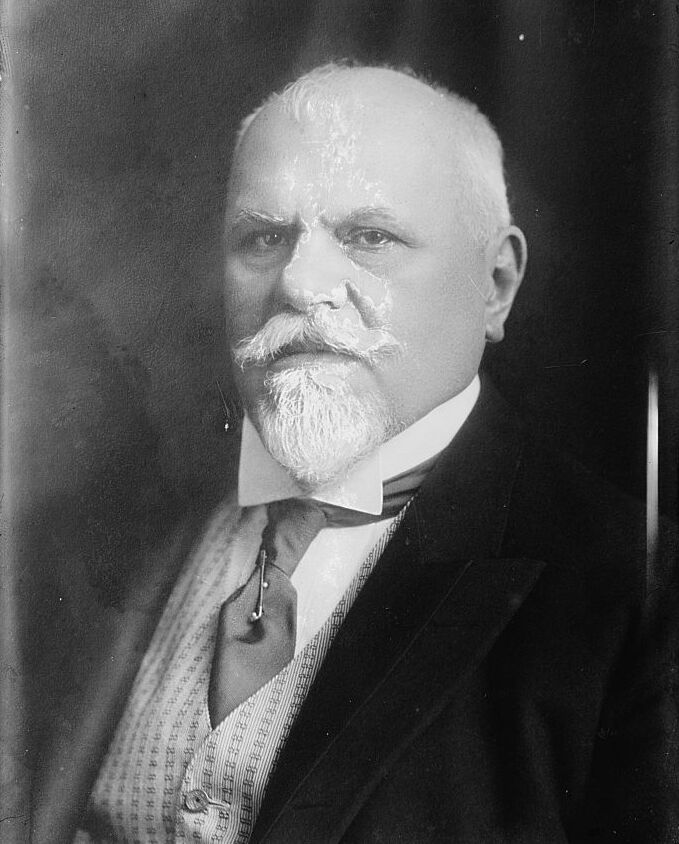
Justo Sierra (1848–1912)

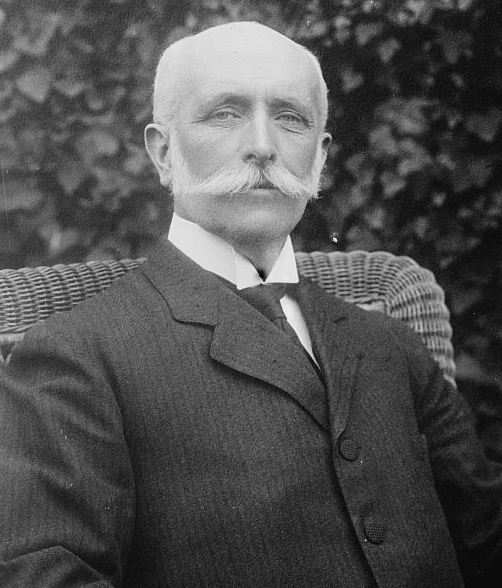
José Yves Limantour (1854–1935)

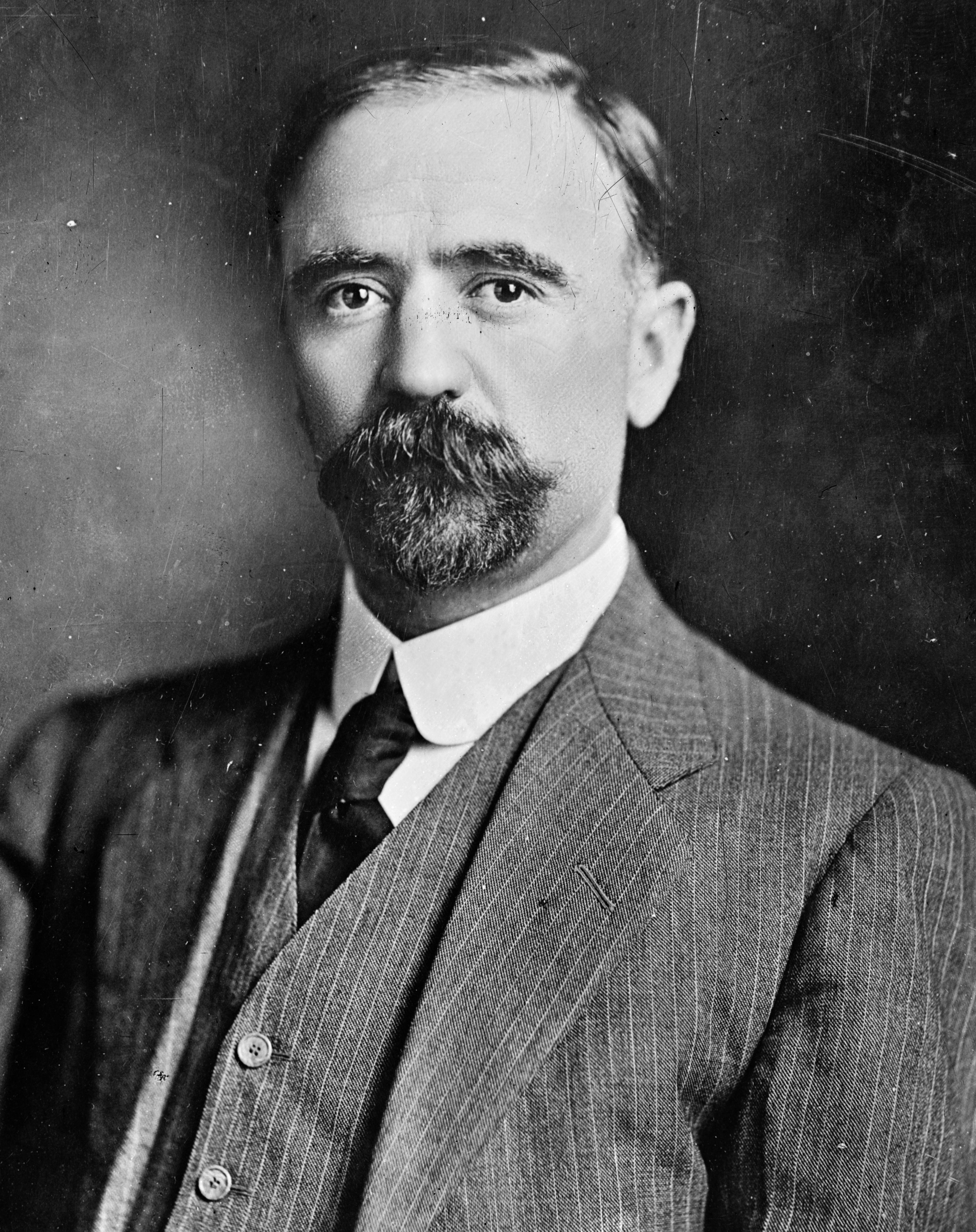
Francisco I. Madero (1873–1913)

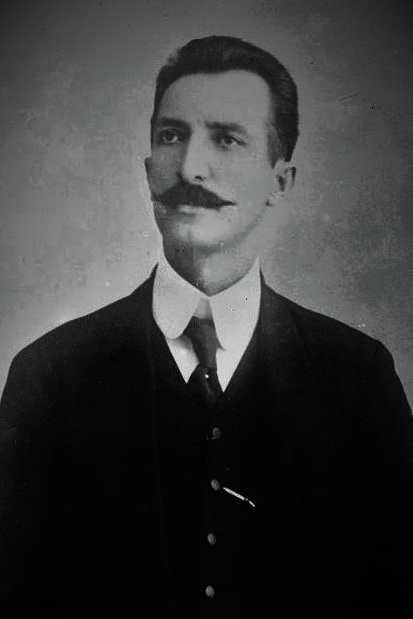
José María Pino Suárez (1869–1913)

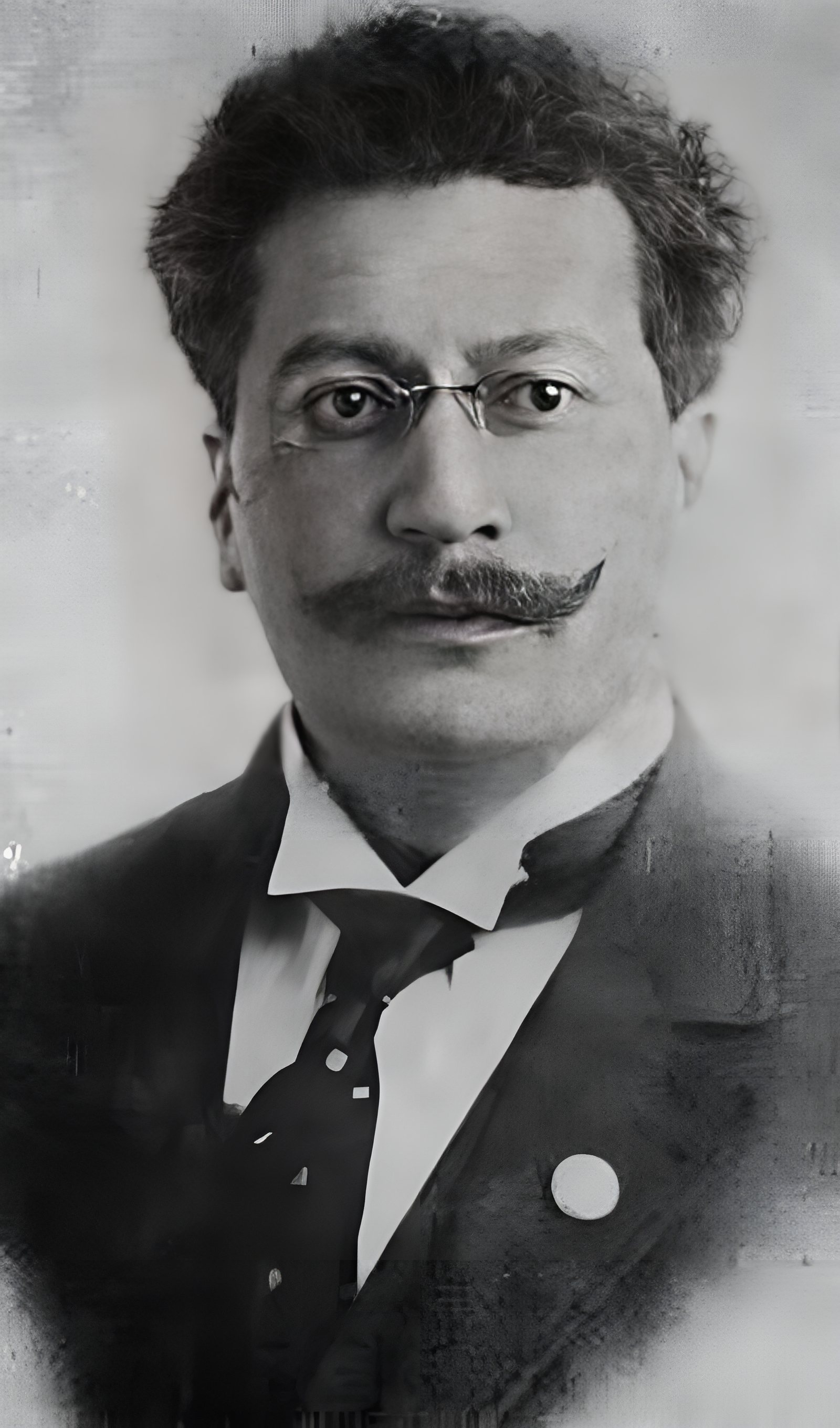
Ricardo Flores Magón (1874–1922)

== See also ==
- History of Mexico
- History of democracy in Mexico
- Politics of Mexico
- History of the Catholic Church in Mexico
- Economic history of Mexico
- Liberal Reform
- Constitution of 1857
- Reform laws
- Reform War
- List of political parties in Mexico
- Education in Mexico
- Porfiriato
- Porfirionism
