= Act of September 25, 1874 =

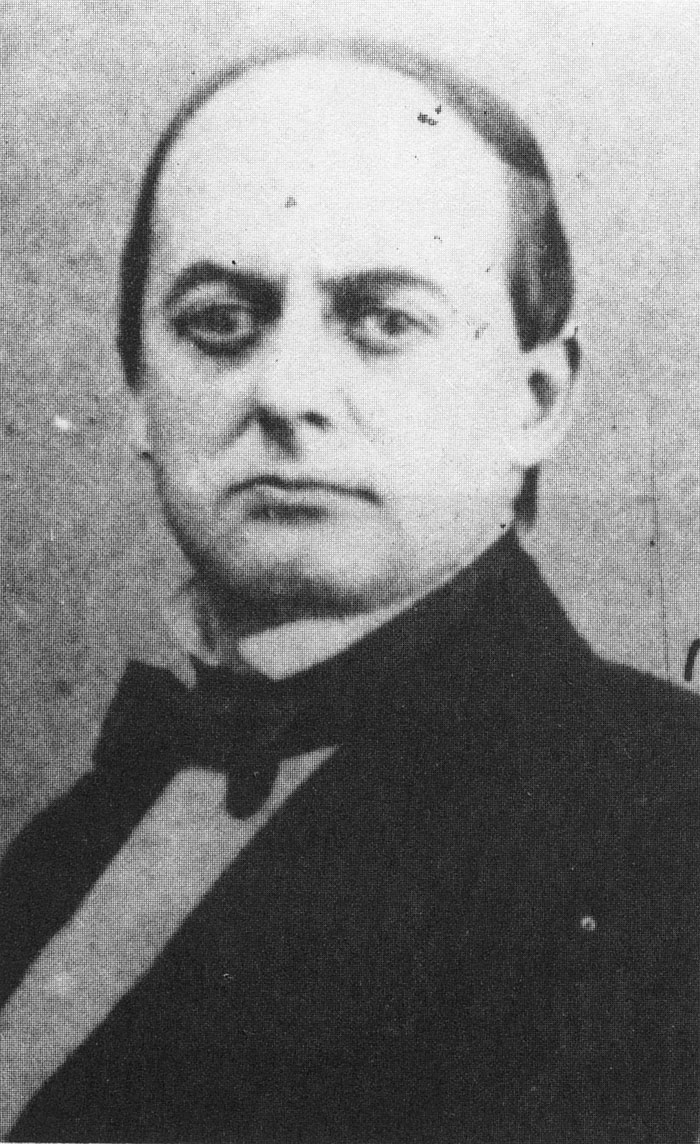
Sebastian Lerdo de Tejada signed into law September 25, 1874.

The Act of September 25, 1874 elevated to constitutional status the Reform Laws at the insistence of President Sebastián Lerdo de Tejada. The laws had been enacted through a decree on September 25, 1873, a series of additions and amendments to the Mexican Constitution of 1857, mandating the separation of church and state.

Through this law the reform process that secularized two acts previously faced the church and marriage oath and consolidated as civil actions where the State was the guarantor of compliance was completed.

== Background ==
The liberal reforms were led by President Benito Juárez. These led to the conflict between conservatives and liberalesque detonated in the Reform War. Shortly after the outbreak of the French intervention in Mexico, which is a continuation of the same conflict.

== Content of the law ==
The articles that make up this law are: 1. The State and the Church are independent of each other. The Congress can not enact laws, establishing or prohibiting any religion. 2. Marriage is a civil contract. This and other acts of the civil status of persons are the exclusive competence of officials and authorities of civil order, under the terms provided by law, and will have the force and validity that they attribute to them. 3. No religious institution can acquire real property or capital taxes on them, with the sole exception established in Article 27 of the Constitution. 4. The simple promise to speak truth and to fulfill the obligations that are contracted, will replace the religious oath with its effects and penalties 5. No one can be forced to give personal works without the right retribution and without their full consent. The State can not allow any contract, covenant or agreement that has as its object the impairment, loss or irrevocable sacrifice of the freedom of man, whether due to work, education or religious vote, to be carried out. The law consequently does not recognize monastic Orders, nor can it allow its establishment, whatever the denomination or object with which they wish to be erected. Nor can it be accepted that a man agrees to his banishment or exile.

== Reactions to the Act of September 25, 1874 ==
The subject specialist Dr. Marta Eugenia Garcia Ugarte notes that the content of the law is "the establishment of marriage as a civil contract, the ban on religious institutions to acquire real estate or capital taxes on them, and replacement of religious oath for the simple promise to tell the truth and fulfill the obligations. "

When they rose to constitutional rank the Reform Laws a long process that transformed the church-state relations closed. The response of the church through the Archbishop of Mexico, Pelagio Antonio de Labastida y Dávalos, followed the Catholic faithful not to swear laws, and even promoted the ignorance of the 1857 Constitution.

== See also ==
- Separation of church and state in the United States
- Marriage law
