= Lerdo law =

1856 Mexican land reform law

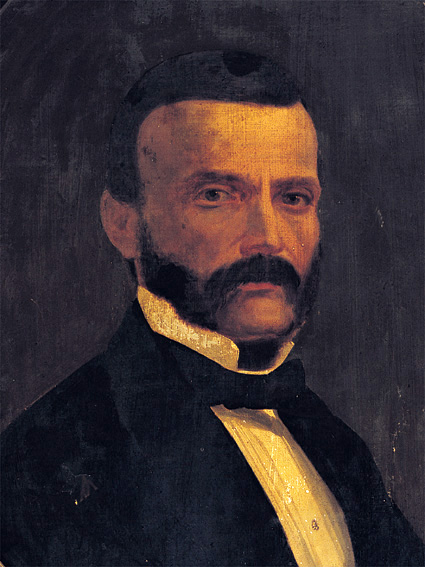
The author of the Lerdo Law, Miguel Lerdo de Tejada.

The Lerdo Law (Spanish: Ley Lerdo) was the common name for the Confiscation of Law and Urban Ruins of the Civil and Religious Corporations of Mexico, part of La Reforma. It targeted not only property owned by the Catholic Church, but also properties held in common by indigenous communities and transferred them to private hands. Enforcement of the law resulted in the confiscation of Church property worth and estimated 300 million pesos, creating a new class of landowners in Mexico's cities and rural regions. Liberals considered such corporate ownership as a major impediment to modernization and development in Mexico. Drafted by Miguel Lerdo de Tejada, it was signed on 25 June 1856 by President Ignacio Comonfort, but its language was ambiguous, needing subsequent clarifications.

Its objectives were to create a market in rural real estate and incentivize development; create rural middle class, improve public finances of the state, and revive the economy by eliminating restrictions on freedom of movement. Properties were to be sold to private individuals, which was expected to stimulate the real estate market and to generate government revenue by a sales tax. Much property held by the Catholic Church was urban and exempt from confiscation. The impact was felt most by indigenous communities, now forced to break up holdings held in common that had allowed communities to retain control of their land. The rural poor lacked the funds to buy property and pay the transfer fees. Most purchasers were large landowners or foreign investors, which further concentrated land ownership. Religious groups and their civil corporations were prohibited from purchasing land sold under law unless for strictly-religious purposes. Implementation of the law was disrupted by the Reform War (1858–60) and the French Intervention (1862–67), but resumed with the defeat of the French invaders and their Conservative allies in 1867. Implementation resumed after that, but not until the regime of Porfirio Díaz was the impact felt significantly.

It was one of the Reform Laws, which sought to establish the separation of church and state, the abolition of ecclesiastical privileges (fueros); and the secularization of registration of births, deaths, and marriages, which gave rise to the Civil Registry.

== Background ==
Nineteenth-century Mexican liberals were not the first to attack the Catholic Church's economic power. The Bourbon monarchy identified the Church's real estate holdings as a problem since they were permanently removed from the real estate market and considered unproductive, and they also gave the Church considerable economic power. During the Bourbon Reforms, the Spanish monarchy sought to undermine the power of the Church, especially the Society of Jesus, and so it expelled the Jesuits, confiscated their highly productive landed estates, and sold them to private individuals. During the colonial era, the Spanish crown had granted a certain amount of land to indigenous communities as corporations to ensure that they had sufficient land to maintain their subsistence.

After independence in 1821, the ecclesiastical right to hold real estate was challenged in the 1830s during the vice-presidency of Valentín Gómez Farías, who implemented the secularization of Franciscan missions in California.

== Excluded properties ==
The law excluded properties that were used by the Catholic Church as an institution for religious purposes. As stipulated in Article 8 of the law, the properties were exempt from the alienation if the buildings used immediately and directly in the service of Church institutions, such as convents, episcopal palaces, municipal schools, hospitals, hospices], markets, and houses of correction charities. Certain properties belonging to municipalities were also exempted: buildings, open lands, and land used exclusively for the public service of their populations.

== Fiscal consolidation ==
All transfers of rural and urban properties executed under the law had a 5% sales tax, which was to be paid in the corresponding general government offices. The taxes were to be in cash and debt bonds, depending on the time to verify the awards. By those policies, the Mexican government intended to increase its low level of tax revenue to improve the public finances.

== Impact on native communities ==
The law required that civil corporations to be stripped of their real estate and so seriously damaged the foundation of the economy of indigenous communities, which owned all of the land in their boundaries. The territories represented a significant income for communities, as most were leased to third parties to raise funds. Thus, their loss worsened the situation of many indigenous people who already lived in poverty.

Natives demanded Finance Minister Miguel Lerdo de Tejada to respect their property rights. However, according to the law, the rights of tenants were reserved to buy their own land before it was offered to foreign buyers.

To prevent their lands from being acquired by others, some indigenous peoples went before a judge to acquire the land as an individual, but the officials charged very high fees and sales taxes, which complicated the recovery process. In other cases, judges had fraudulent dealings with those interested in the territories to acquire land even before the natives learned of the existence of the law, which made it virtually impossible for communities to retain their territories.
