= Ignacio Comonfort =

President of Mexico from 1855 to 1858

The Most Excellent Ignacio Comonfort
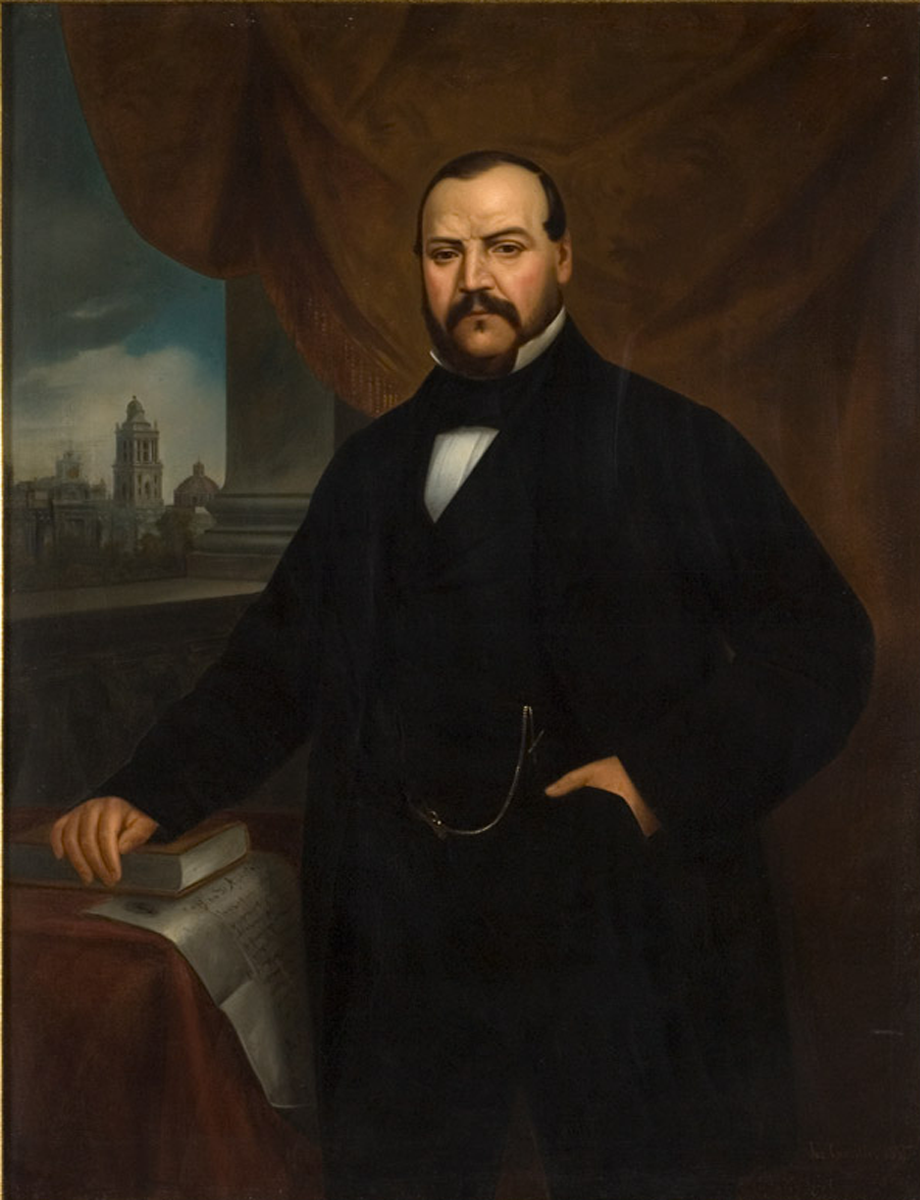
- Portrait made by José Carrillo in 1855, oil on canvas, Museo de Historia Mexicana.

25th President of Mexico
- In office 11 December 1855 – 21 January 1858
- Preceded by: Juan Álvarez
- Succeeded by: Benito Juárez; Félix María Zuloaga

Secretary of War and Navy of Mexico
- In office 10 October 1854 – 17 December 1857
- President: Juan Álvarez
- Preceded by: Manuel de Sandoval
- Succeeded by: Manuel María de Sandoval
- In office 19 August 1861 – 13 November 1862
- President: Benito Juárez
- Preceded by: Felipe Berriozábal
- Succeeded by: Juan Suárez y Navarro

Governor of Tamaulipas
- In office 16 March 1861 – 9 August 1862
- Preceded by: Jesús de la Serna
- Succeeded by: Albino López

Governor of Jalisco
- In office 22 September 1854 – 30 August 1855
- Preceded by: Manuel Gamboa
- Succeeded by: Santos Degollado

Personal details
- Born: 12 March 1812 Amozoc de Mota, Puebla, Viceroyalty of New Spain
- Died: 13 November 1863 (aged 51) Chamacueros, Guanajuato, Mexico (now Municipio de Comonfort)
- Resting place: Panteón de San Fernando
- Party: Liberal Party
- Occupation: Military officer; politician

Military service
- Allegiance: Mexico
- Branch/service: Mexican Army
- Years of service: 1832–1863
- Rank: General
- Battles/wars: Mexican–American War; Revolution of Ayutla; Second Franco-Mexican War †

Ignacio Gregorio Comonfort de los Ríos (Spanish pronunciation: [iɣˈnasjo komoɱˈfoɾ ðe los ˈri.os]; 12 March 1812 – 13 November 1863), also known as Ignacio Comonfort, was a Mexican politician and soldier who was also president during La Reforma.

He played a leading role in the liberal movement under the Plan of Ayutla to overthrow the dictatorship of Santa Anna in 1855; he then served in the cabinet of the new president, Juan Álvarez. Comonfort was a moderate liberal and assumed the presidency when Álvarez stepped down after only a few months. The Constitution of 1857 was drafted during his presidency, incorporating changes enacted in individual laws of the Liberal Reform. The constitution was met with opposition from conservatives as its forceful anticlerical provisions undermined the economic power and privileged status of the Catholic Church as an institution. Most notably the Lerdo law stripped the Church's ability to hold property. The law also forced the breakup of communal land holdings of indigenous communities, which enabled them to resist integration economically and culturally. The controversy was further inflamed when the government mandated that all civil servants take an oath to uphold the new constitution, which left Catholic public servants with the choice between either keeping their jobs or being excommunicated.

Comonfort considered the anticlerical articles of the constitution too radical, likely to provoke a violent reaction. He also objected to the deliberate weakening of the power of the executive branch of government by empowering the legislative branch. He had been dealing with revolts since the beginning of his administration and the new constitution left the president powerless to act. Hoping to reach compromise with the conservatives and other opponents of the constitution, he joined the Plan of Tacubaya, nullifying the constitution in December 1857. Congress was dissolved and Comonfort remained as president, only to be completely abandoned by his liberal allies. He backed out of the plan and resigned from the presidency. He was succeeded by the president of the Supreme Court, Benito Juárez. Comonfort went into exile as the bloody Reform War broke out, a civil war the conservatives lost in 1861. Comonfort returned to the country in 1862 to fight against the invasion by France that Mexican conservatives supported. Comonfort was killed in action in defense of the Republic on 13 November 1863.

== Early life ==
Ignacio Comonfort was born in Puebla on 12 March 1812. His parents were lieutenant colonel Mariano Comonfort and Maria Guadalupe de los Rios. At the age of 14, he began his studies at the Carolino College in Puebla, a school run by Jesuits. He was twenty years old in 1832 when he took part in the liberal revolt which overthrew President Anastasio Bustamante and saw action at San Agustin del Palmar and Puebla. During the subsequent Siege of Mexico City, he was already a captain of the cavalry and fought at Tacubaya, Casas Blancas, Zumpango, San Lorenzo, and Posadas, and gave proof of his great military talent until Bustamante was overthrown and the Zavaleta Accords put an end to the revolution. He was named military commander of Izúcar de Matamoros.

== Centralist Republic of Mexico ==
When General Mariano Arista as part of a conservative revolt against the administration of Valentín Gómez Farías besieged Puebla with a vastly superior force, Comonfort defended one of its most exposed points. Arista was repulsed and Comonfort returned to his job as a military commander. In 1834, he returned to defend Puebla against the siege of General Guadalupe Victoria but lost. The victorious conservatives would turn the First Mexican Republic into the Centralist Republic of Mexico Comonfort left the city and returned to his family, where he remained for four years until he was named prefect and military commander of Tlapa in which he made many material improvements. He also had to deal with many southern indigenous revolts within his jurisdiction, including one case in which Comonfort, with twenty-four troops almost without ammunition, sustained a siege against two thousand indigenous troops.

== Involvement in politics ==
He was a deputy in Congress in 1842 and 1846. The 1842 Congress was dissolved by Santa Anna and the one in 1846 by Mariano Paredes. Comonfort took part in the revolt against the Paredes government in late 1846, during the early stages of the Mexican–American War which restored the federalist Constitution of 1824. He was elected to the presidency of the third ayuntamiento in the capital and was made prefect of western State of Mexico. He participated in the Mexican–American War, occupying the dangerous position of assistant to the commander-in-chief, and was part of the congress that met at Querétaro after the U.S. Army took the capital. He was elected senator the following year in 1848, and later made a customs official in the port of Acapulco, although he was removed from this position during the last dictatorship of Santa Anna in 1854.

== Plan of Ayutla ==
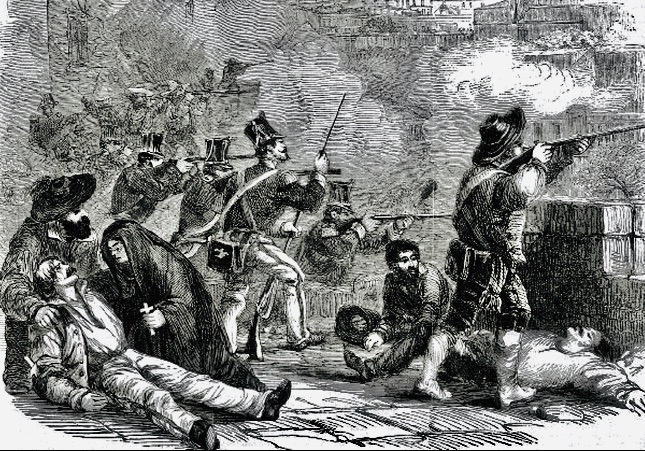
Fighting during the Plan of Ayutla

Comonfort's liberal sympathies, military office, and presence in the South would lead him to play a key role in the Plan of Ayutla, unifying liberal opposition to Santa Anna, formulated by the dissident Colonel Florencio Villareal on 1 March 1854. The plan proclaimed a revolutionary program in the town of Ayutla, Guerrero, condemning the dictatorship of Santa Anna, attacking measures such as military conscription, and the selling of the Mesilla valley to the U.S., known there as the Gadsden Purchase. The plan declared Santa Anna deposed and called for the convocation of a new president and a representative assembly to reorganize the government. The plan was ratified at Acapulco by Colonel Comonfort, among others, with some amendments, including a provision allowing changes to be made in accordance with the national will. Juan Álvarez was chosen as head of the movement.

Comonfort, in charge of the fortress of Acapulco, resisted a siege by Santa Anna who appeared on 20 April 1854, but soon had to retreat. During the revolution, Comonfort went on an important mission abroad to gain war materiel. Comonfort later established his base of operations in Michoacán and prepared to march on Guadalajara. After months of fighting, Santa Anna resigned in August 1855, but Comonfort refused to recognize his government-appointed successor Martín Carrera, whom he viewed as an effort by the remainders of the administration to coopt the revolution. Comonfort entered Guadalajara on 22 August 1855 and published a circular arguing that only Juan Álvarez could be recognized as the leader of the revolution. By September, Comonfort was at Lagos conferring with the independent revolutionary leaders Antonio de Haro y Tamariz and Manuel Doblado, effecting their recognition of Álvarez's leadership. Álvarez assumed the presidency in August.

== Role in Alvarez administration ==
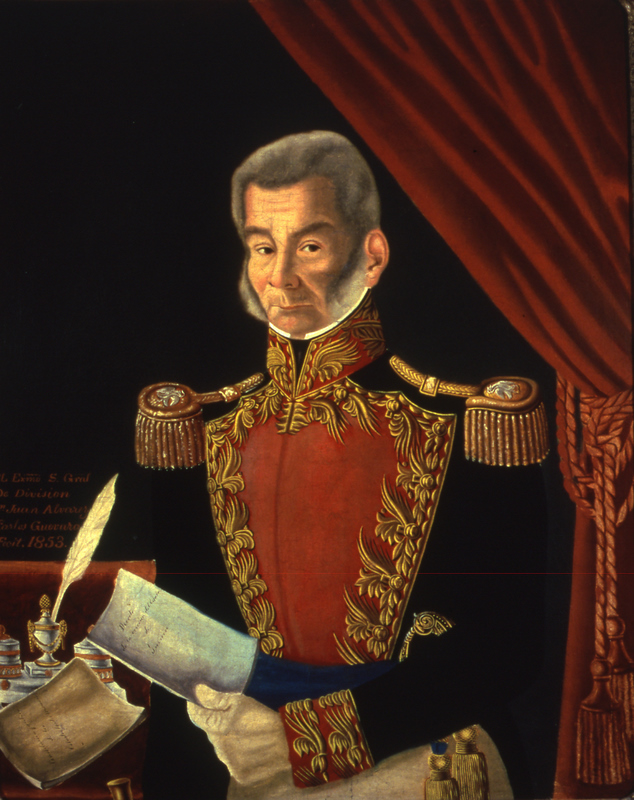
President Juan Álvarez

=== Minister of War ===
President Alvarez proceeded to form a cabinet and chose Ignacio Comonfort as Minister of War. Melchor Ocampo was made Minister of Relations, Guillermo Prieto was made Minister of the Treasury, and Benito Juárez of Justice and Ecclesiastical Affairs. Miguel Lerdo de Tejada was made Minister of Development.

On 16 October, a call was made for a congress to assemble at Dolores Hidalgo in February 1856, to organize the nation under the republican, democratic, and representative form, based upon a decree dating back to the -Bases of Tacubaya in 1841. Alvarez would step down before this date, and it was Comonfort who was destined to be president during that fateful session.

Due to the disorder, the military had caused throughout Mexican history, the idea began to be floated in the cabinet of dissolving the military and rebuilding it from the ground. Ocampo and Juárez were in favor while Comonfort was against, wishing instead to reform the military class, but not destroy it. This was just one example of the divisions that existed within the cabinet and Comonfort was publicly perceived as more moderate than his fellow ministers.

Alvarez, who had meanwhile been governing from Cuernavaca, now moved himself and his troops to Mexico City. The filth and brutality of his troops, known as 'pintos' (mottled ones), caused general disgust and alarm and led to rumors that Alvarez would be overthrown in favor of Comonfort.

=== Juárez law ===
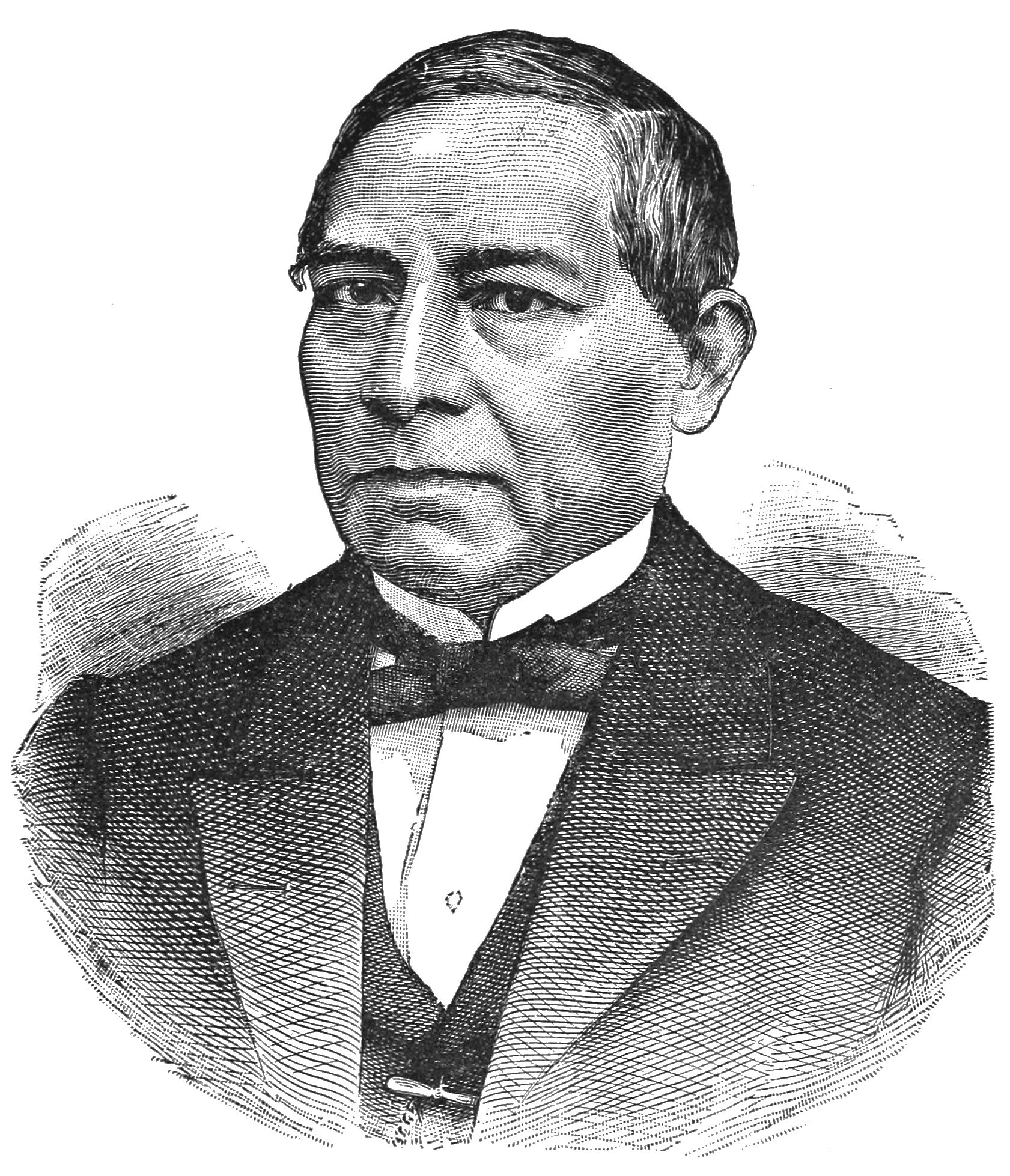
Minister Juárez

Álvarez's cabinet, which included the progressive state governors Benito Juárez and Melchor Ocampo, as well as the writer Guillermo Prieto, represented a new generation of liberals that had come of age since independence in 1821 and intended to pass unprecedented reforms in a period which began with the Álvarez administration and would eventually come to be known as the Liberal Reform. The reforms culminated in a new constitution in 1857, and open conflict with its opponents that did not entirely end until 1867.

They began with the Juárez Law, which passed on 22 November 1855. Ecclesiastical courts were stripped of their right to judge civil law cases involving the Catholic clergy. They were allowed to continue judging clergy under canon law. Opponents of the measure accused government deputies of hypocrisy for claiming to support equality before the law while maintaining their immunity.

The Archbishop protested against the measure and suggested that the question of the ecclesiastical fuero should be submitted to the pope, a suggestion the government rejected. The conservative generals Santa Anna and Blanco were officially stripped of their ranks and the liberals Santos Degollado and Moreno were commissioned as generals. Comonfort was now threatening to resign and only keep the office of general in chief. Álvarez directed his secretaries to lay before him proposals on how to proceed. He also directed his council to prepare a draft of the statute. Meanwhile, the conservatives began to favor the moderate Comonfort for the presidency.

=== Assumption of the Presidency ===
Alvarez seriously considered stepping down from the presidency and handing it over to Comonfort, but the latter's enemies urged Alvarez to stay in office. On 4 December, Alvarez summoned a meeting of the most prominent members of the Liberal party for advice on how to proceed. He wavered on the matter and the following day accepted the resignation of his entire ministry and summoned Luis de la Rosa to organize another. The portfolios would remain empty for the rest of Alvarez's presidency.

In Guanajuato, Manuel Doblado pronounced against the government of Juan Alvarez on 6 December, holding up the moderate Ignacio Comonfort as the new president. His proclamation accused Alvarez of attacking religion, the one thing that bound Mexicans together. This proved redundant, as before news of the revolt even reached the capital, the elderly President Alvarez, who was not enjoying administrative tasks or the climate of Mexico City, decided to step down and announced this on 8 December. Alvarez met with Comonfort and officially transferred the presidency to him on 11 December at four o'clock in the afternoon.

== Presidency ==
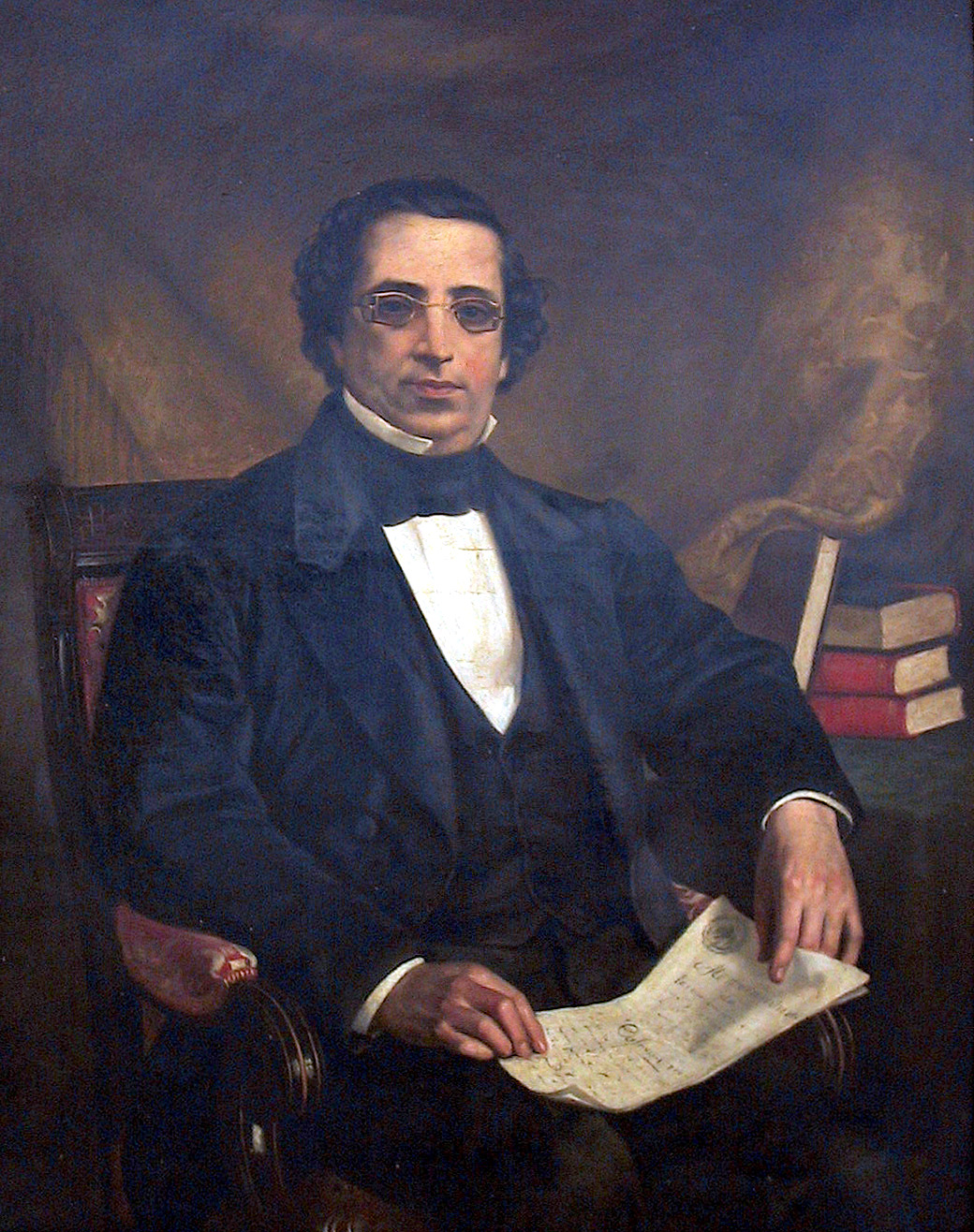
Minister Lafragua

Comonfort appointed his cabinet two days after he assumed the presidency. Luis de la Rosa was made Minister of Relations, Ezequiel Montes was made Minister of Justice and Ecclesiastical Affairs, Manuel Siliceo was made Minister of Development, José María Lafragua was made Minister of Interior Relations, Manuel Payno was made Minister of the Treasury, and Jose Yanez was made Minister of War and Marine.

The ministers outlined their program, which was to avoid any dismemberment of the national territory, as Santa Anna had engaged in with the Gadsden Purchase, avoid civil war, use force only as a last resort, and convoke a constitutional congress at once to frame the constitution, and in the meantime publish an organic statute as a provisional constitution. The government set out to dismantle the remainder of Santa Anna's dictatorship. On 9 January 1856, a decree was passed to hold Santa Anna, his ministers, governors and other subordinates responsible for their to the nation and individuals for their illegal acts. Their estates were seized and placed at the disposal of the supreme court to meet damages. The ministry also promised legislation on personal rights, the press, police, the national guard and a moderate approach towards ecclesiastical affairs. Economic measures included opening ports to commerce, opening facilities for commerce, manufacturing, and mining, as well as for education. Foreigners were allowed to own real estate under certain conditions.

=== San Luis Potosi revolt ===
A revolt now flared up at San Luis Potosí. Over 1,000 men of Rosas Landa's brigades returning from Nuevo León under the lead of Manuel Maria Calvo revolted on 10 December 1856, and Rosas Landa was taken prisoner. There were rumors that a group of conservatives were directing these revolts from the capital. There were hostile movements in Michoacán and Tlaxcala, and Tomás Mejía still led troops around San Juan de los Llanos. The Indians of Chapala revolted with instigation from Guadalajara. Osollo, pursued by Lamberg, went to San Luis Potosí to assume command of the revolt there.

The government dispatched 4,000 men under Anastasio Parrodi which had been organized by the governors of Zacatecas and Guanajuato. The insurgents soon found themselves short on resources and filled with dissension. One of their chiefs seized money from a British consul's house, but the leaders of the revolt ultimately concluded that they did not have enough men and resources to defend San Luis Potosí, and the city was mostly abandoned. After their evacuation, Parrodi laid siege to them on Magdalena Hill near the town of Cadereita. They retreated on 6 February 1857 and were routed in Tunas Blancas. Colonel Osollo was taken prisoner.

=== Puebla revolt ===
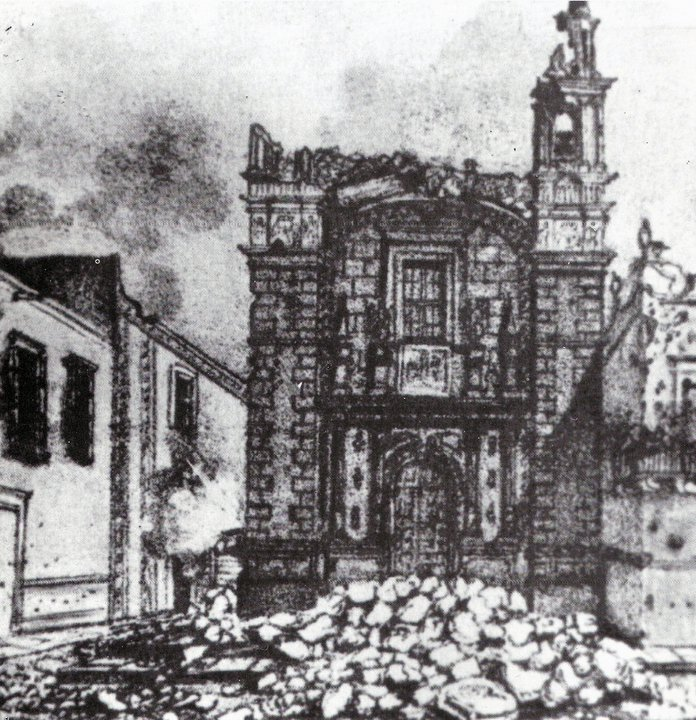
Church of San Cristóbal, Puebla after the Siege of 1855.

A revolt broke out in Puebla on 12 December but was shortly taken care of. General Guitian then joined a revolt at Zacapoaxtla against Ley Juarez, though Bishop Labastida advised him to make peace with the government. The first forces sent against them under General Ignacio de la Llave, Colonel Ortega and Lieutenant Colonel Calderon joined the rebels. They were also then joined by Miguel Miramón. Scattered conservative revolts followed in Oaxaca, Zacatecas, Querétaro, and Jalisco.

Under the suspicion of sedition, Comonfort decreed the expulsion from the country of Antonio de Haro y Tamariz, Francisco Pacheco, and Agustín Zires. Haro escaped and joined the rebels at Zacapoaxtla, demanding the re-establishment of the Bases Organicas of 1843. The rebels next attacked Puebla on 16 January 1855, and the governor surrendered without a fight. The revolution was now formidable, as the army had four thousand men, abundant supplies, and control of the second-largest city in the republic.

Five thousand troops under generals Villareal, Traconis, Zuloaga, Gayosso, and Moreno marched out of Mexico City on 29 January to suppress the revolt at Puebla. A thousand more men were expected from Guanajuato. Comonfort intended to conduct the operations himself. On 24 February, he had 11,500 men placed in the echelon and 4000 men of the national guard were stationed at the capital. He then set off for the front on 29 February and made his headquarters at Rio Prieto. The insurgents meanwhile retreated within the walls of Puebla.

The Puebla garrison made a sally in force on 8 March, and a battle was fought at half past seven o'clock in the morning at Ocotlan. After two hours of fighting without any decisive results, Haro asked for a truce, and while he held a conference with Comonfort, Haro's troops retreated to Puebla.

On 9 March, Comonfort began a siege which lasted until the 22nd when the insurgents finally surrendered. Comonfort refused to negotiate with Haro and the latter thus handed his command over to Castillo and Guitian, and they to Oronoz, who finally negotiated the surrender. Haro meanwhile escaped and went into hiding. In the final negotiations, the rank-and-file troops were allowed to remain in the government or to retire from service, and the officers were arrested to await their fate.

Orders were issued for Haro's arrest. On 31 March, the federal government issued a decree that the governors of Puebla and Veracruz should seize the properties of the church, except those being used for public worship, and sell them to pay for the damages caused by the rebellion.

=== Constitutional Congress ===
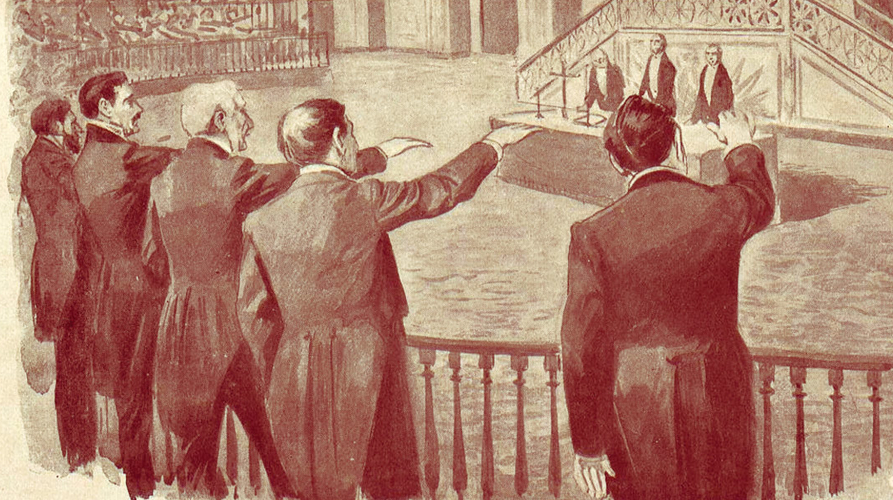
Deputies swear an oath to the Constitution of 1857

The first meeting of the congress which had been called on 16 October of the previous year under the Alvarez administration, occurred on 14 February. Nothing of substance was passed until the 21st when Alvarez's decree transferring executive power to Comonfort was ratified by a majority of 72 votes to 7, thus granting Comonfort a substantial mandate.

The congress was thoroughly progressive, echoing the radical congress of 1833 under Valentín Gómez Farías, but a measure to re-adopt the federalist Constitution of 1824, which had long been championed by the liberals, failed to pass by one vote. Efforts began on a draft of a new constitution.

Congress ratified the Juárez law and nullified many of the commissions that had been made by Santa Anna.

On 12 May, the Bishop of Puebla was exiled from Mexico for resisting the seizure of church properties. On 5 June, after a secret session, congress voted 70 to 14 to expel Jesuits from the country. Critics of the government accused this measure of hypocritically violating the liberal principle of freedom of religion. Conservatives feared another wave of anti-clerical legislation, as had occurred in 1833.

The government also had to deal with the ever-present financial crisis, as Santa Anna's taxes had been lifted and the only source of revenue left was the excise taxes, that northern Governor Vidaurri objected to, duties from customs, which were not substantial, due to a lack of confidence from merchants. The Spanish sent a squadron to the Port of Vera Cruz with representative Miguel de los Santos Alvarez on board, and this was interpreted as a hostile demonstration by nervous merchants.

The organic statute meanwhile had been passed on 15 May. The statue tended toward the centralization of the government by extending the action of the executive over everything, even municipalities. Limits were however placed on this wide authority. The constitutional congress clashed with the president over his claimed power to interfere in the proceedings. Comonfort wished to temper the efforts of the deputies who in response to Santa Anna's recent dictatorship, intended to set up a government that Comonfort viewed as too weak.

The draft of the new constitution had its first reading on 16 June, and the consideration of its clauses was begun at once. Like the Constitution of 1824, it embodied many principles borrowed from the Constitution of the United States. The Declaration of the Rights of Man took into consideration the judicial thought and constitutions of the world's most advanced nations. Equality before the law was accepted as a fundamental right.

The organization of Coahuila and Nuevo León was now an issue for the government. Governor Santiago Vidaurri had attempted to annex the greater part of Coahuila's towns to Nuevo León, but Comonfort on 15 April 1856, declared this act null, a decree that was confirmed by Congress.

Comonfort struggled against both the radical wing of his party and against clerical conservatives, both of which accused the president of conceding too much to the other.

=== Ley Lerdo ===
In June 1856, another major controversy emerged over the promulgation of the Ley Lerdo, named after the secretary of the treasury. The law was aimed at the collective ownership of the real estate. It forced 'civil or ecclesiastical institutions' to sell any land that they owned, with the tenants getting priority and generous terms for buying the land that they lived on. It was mostly aimed at the church, but the law was also aimed at Mexico's native communities who were forced to sell their communal lands, the ejidos.

On 1 July, Archbishop Garza protested to the government that the properties were likely to be bought by a few rich individuals, argued that the church had previously lent to the government during crises, and defended the church's record of treating tenants more generously than private owners. Minister of Interior and Foreign Relations Montez received him courteously, but his protests did not change government policy. The law was designed to develop Mexico's economy by increasing the number of private property owners, but in practice, the land was bought up by rich speculators. Most of the lost indigenous land went to haciendas.

=== New Constitution ===
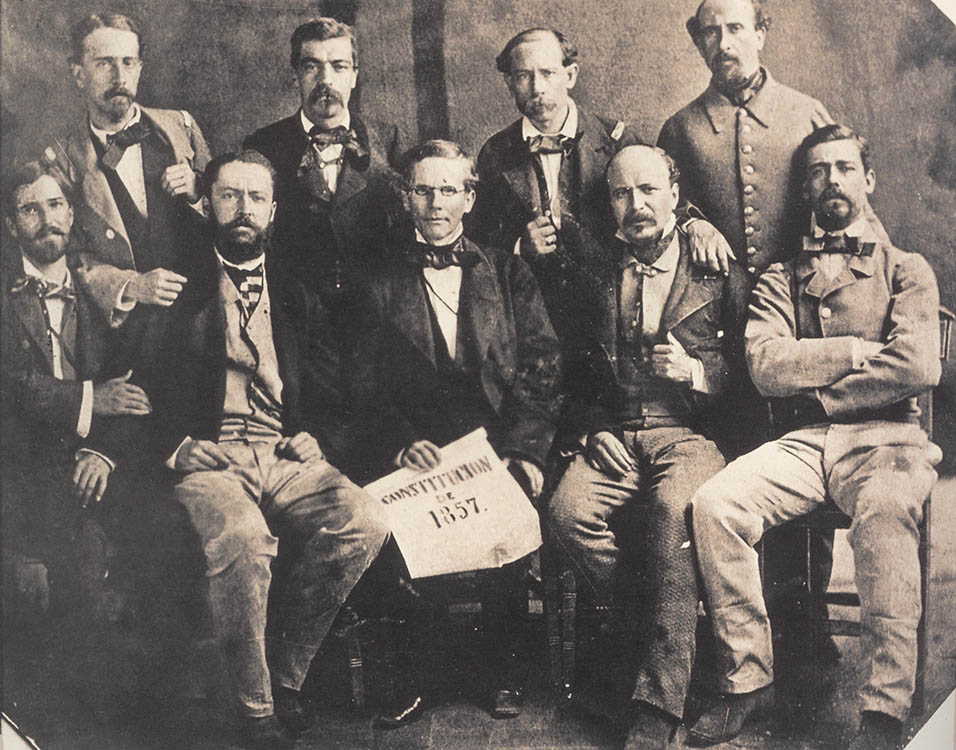
Liberals posing with a copy of the Constitution of 1857.

Meanwhile, the drafting of the new constitution continued amidst the opposition of the conservative press as well as opposition within the committee assigned to the task, two of whose members had given a dissenting vote on the current draft. Two other members approved it with reservations, and another declined to sign it. Many members of Congress advocated the revival of the Constitution of 1824, while the distinguished statesman Luis de la Rosa also opposed the new constitution, congress as a whole approved it, 93 to 5.

A debate on religious freedom began on 29 July, with 106 deputies present and a large crowd in the galleries. It lasted until 5 August when it decided not to put the article to a vote. Ultimately religious freedom would not make it into the constitution, but neither would an article making Mexico a confessional state as in previous constitutions, thus resulting in a type of de facto religious freedom.

The constitutional congress wrapped up its work on 5 February 1857, and the fundamental code was signed and its support swore to by each congressman after which President Comonfort swore an oath to observe the constitution. After this, both Congress and the president addressed the nation and the new constitution was promulgated by Comonfort on 12 February. On that day the government also issued a comprehensive electoral law with 67 articles. The constitution was not meant to come into force until 16 September. Before the end of the year, Comonfort himself would have disavowed the constitution and civil war would have broken out.

The constitutional congress closed its session on 17 February and Comonfort in the meantime passed laws establishing a civil state register and government-run cemeteries.

=== Oath to the Constitution ===
On 17 March 1857, it was decreed that all civil servants had to publicly swear and sign an oath to the constitution. The Catholic Church decreed excommunication for anyone that took the oath, and subsequently, many Catholics in the Mexican government lost their jobs for refusing the oath.

The Franco-Mexican liberal paper Trait d'Union (Hyphen) proclaimed that war had been declared between church and state and featured stories on who had refused the oath, including judges and other federal civil servants. The press noted many cases of minor and local officials also refusing the oath. Others retracted their oaths to be able to receive the sacraments during Lent, which had begun that year shortly after the decree requiring an oath.

Liberal officials however struck back at opposition to the oath and the constitution. Governor Juárez of Oaxaca expelled all priests who refused Christian burial to supporters of the constitution. In Aguascalientes, Governor Lopez de Nava also cracked down on those refusing to take the oath by depriving them of political rights. Governor Alatiste of Puebla outright ordered public prayers for the success of the constitutional authorities.

=== Leadup to the War of Reform ===
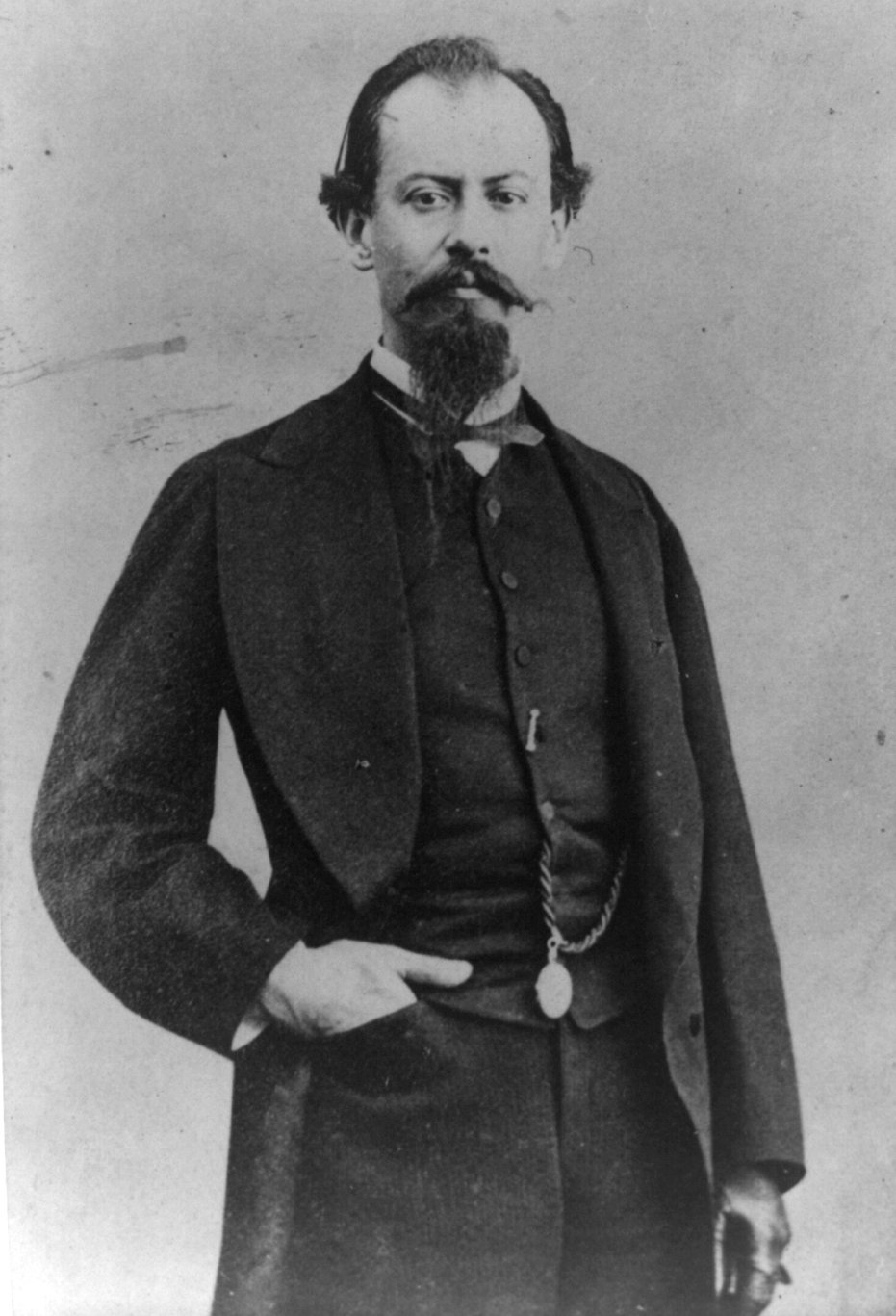
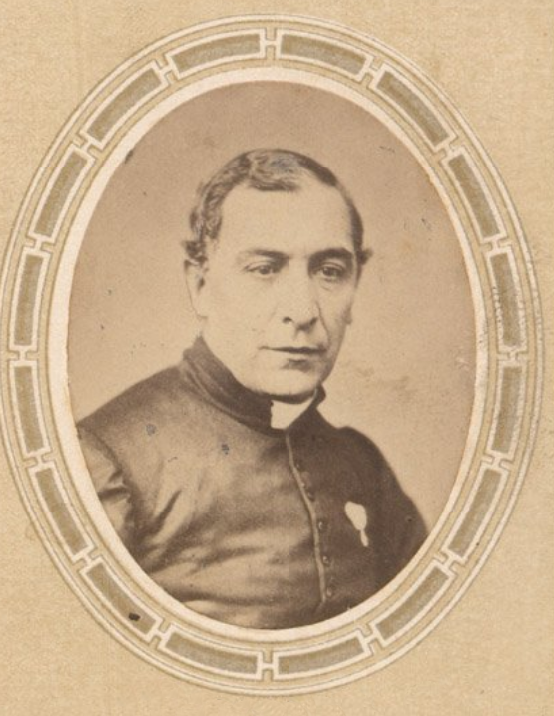
Lieutenant Colonel Miguel Miramón (left) and Father Francisco Javier Mirando (right), leaders of the Puebla Revolt.

The clergy of Puebla were resolved to obstruct at all hazards the execution of the Lerdo Law, whereupon the government adopted stringent measures. The sale of the property went on though slowly owing to conscientious objectors and fear of political persecution by others and the government exiled both military officers and ecclesiastics charged with sedition. On the night of 15 September, many Franciscans were arrested and their convent was occupied by troops, and on the 17th the government decreed the suppression of the convent and the seizure of all its property except the main church and chapels, sacred vessels ornaments, relics, and images which were handed over to the archbishop.

Ezequiel Montes was dispatched in early October to Rome by the government to try to convince the pope to agree on the constitution. The archbishop was asked by the government to restrain the clergy who were urging disobedience to the government. Comonfort accepted the resignation of Puebla governor Traconis and replaced him with the more moderate Jose Maria Garcia Conde.

The clerical uprisings did not make up the only insurgency that Comonfort had to deal with, as Governor Santiago Vidaurri of Nuevo León had revolted on the northern frontier, seizing Saltillo and Matehuala. Nearly all of the nation's available troops had to be sent to the north to deal with Vidaurri's uprising.

The garrison of Querétaro City on 13 October fell into the hands of the conservative officer Tomás Mejía. The rebels, in addition to the usual conservative cause of 'religion y fueros' also promised the Indians to protect their landed property which had also been targeted by the Ley Lerdo.

Another revolt flared up in Puebla City on 20 October when Colonel Joaquin Orihuela and Lieutenant Colonel Miguel Miramón led by Father Francisco Javier Miranda y Morfi, seized the artillery and the ammunition, arrested the governor, commandant general and demanded an end to the Juarez and Lerdo Laws. The prisoners were later liberated in a rescue by lieutenant colonel Diaz Quijano.

The revolts united Congress behind the president and acquiesced to Comonfort's request for emergency powers, granting him a vote of confidence joined in even by the progressive hardliners whom Comonfort had previously clashed with. A commission was named to negotiate with Vidaurri's government in Nuevo León.

Forces were dispatched against Puebla led by General Tomas Moreno, and reinforced with troops from Tlaxcala until the total forces amounted to over 4,000 men under General Traconis, Felix Zuloaga, Trias, and Emilio Langberg. Operations planned to capture not destroy the rebels, and they only numbered 200, but they made an unexpected defense, sustained by a belief that sympathetic movements were breaking out all over the country, which they did to a limited extent. The besieged conservatives finally surrendered on November 29, though Miramon and Orihuela managed to escape.

A ministerial crisis led to the appointment of a new ministry, more moderate whose head was the Minister of Relations, Sebastian Lerdo de Tejada. Angonio Garcia was made Minister of Justice, and Amarcelino Castaneda was made Minister of Government and was shortly succeeded by Jesus Teran. Comonfort vacillated back and forth between the moderate party and the radical party wondering if it was prudent or not in carrying out all of the constitution's unprecedented reforms.

The opposition press now began to advocate that Comonfort continue ruling with extraordinary powers rather than allow the constitution to come into force, though the majority of the liberals did not take seriously the notion that Comonfort would join such a scheme.

The government's problems were now complicated by the Spanish refusal to accept the Mexican plenipotentiary La Fragua and made suggestions that the Spanish government intended to interfere in Mexico. A minor war scare flared up and applications to join the national guard surged.

Another ministerial crisis on 15 September led to the entire cabinet resigning and the ministries being left in charge of the chief clerks. Comonfort's emergency powers had now ended, a newly elected congress was not yet meeting, and the country was rife with insurrections. Businesses in the capital closed up and troops patrolled the streets.

Congress was installed on 8 October and Comonfort soon requested emergency powers to deal with the insurgencies. Congress denied the request, and many of the deputies disagreed that the situation demanded it. Comonfort remained determined to seek the necessary executive powers. Congress conceded by granting emergency powers to the state governors and on 3 November suspended certain articles of the constitution impeding Comonfort's ability to suppress rebellion: namely those on freedom of speech, assembly, bearing arms, and due process. Congress meanwhile counted the votes for the presidential elections which had been held earlier in the year, with Comonfort receiving a majority. Comonfort officially assumed the executive on 1 December 1857. In his inaugural address, he asked the representatives to amend the constitution, insisting that he had a respectful record of supporting liberal causes.

=== Plan of Tacubaya ===
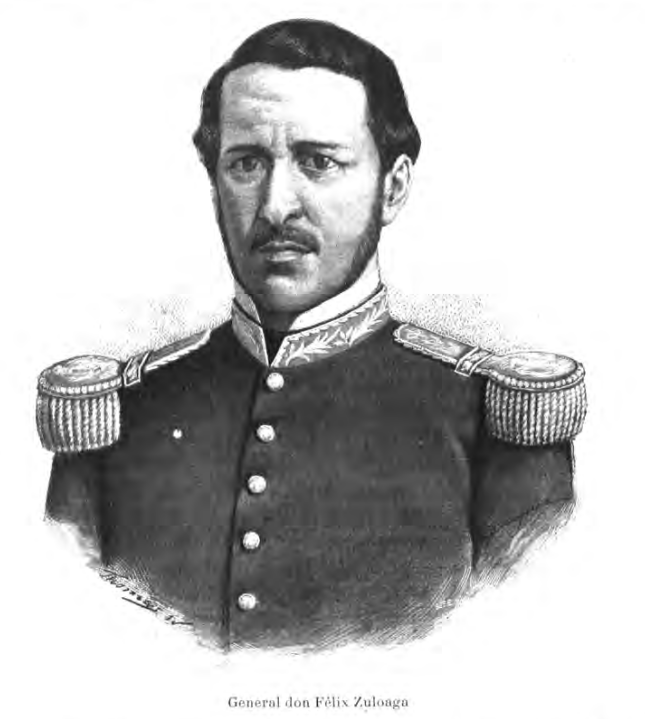
Felix Maria Zuloaga

The conservative conspirators were now sounding out the support of the governors for a plan to suppress Congress and restore Comonfort's emergency powers. Members of Comonfort's government, Minister Payno and General Félix María Zuloaga were accused of plotting against the constitution, which caused much displeasure in Congress, but finally, Zuloaga was indicted. After arranging with certain governors, the conspirators in a suburb of Mexico City declared the Plan of Tacubaya on the morning of 17 December to set aside the national constitution. The supreme control of the government was to be entrusted to Ignacio Comonfort who was to convoke within three months another constitutional congress for framing another constitution more in line with the national will, to be submitted to a national plebiscite and in the event of its non-acceptance to be returned to the congress for an amendment. The president was to rule with a consultative council composed of one representative from each state.

On 17 December, congress made a solemn protest against the Plan of Tacubaya and declared that Comonfort's authority had now ended. Zuloaga's brigade occupied the capital and dissolved the congress. Benito Juárez, president of the Supreme Court and Isidoro Olvera, president of the Congress were arrested. The ayuntamiento of Mexico City was also dissolved. On 19 December, Comonfort officially announced that he had accepted the Plan of Tacubaya. He released a manifesto explaining his motives, expounding that he viewed the Plan of Tacubaya as an opportunity for a moderate compromise and viewing the alternative as anarchy.

Seventy deputies reassembled in Querétaro and aired their protests. A council of state was installed on 25 December in which skeptical voices opined that it was impossible to bring about the reconciliation that Comonfort sought. On 30 December the strategic state of Vera Cruz abandoned the Plan of Tacubaya, convincing Comonfor that his new government's position was precarious.

=== Resignation ===
Comonfort now sought to move away from the government he had helped bring to power. He made known to troops in the interior his repentance of having supported the Plan of Tacubaya and to surrender the executive over to the president of the Supreme Court. He thought at one point of even joining the troops to fight against the reactionists. His ruling council now advised him to make a complete retraction. Minister of War Garcia Conde proposed a conference of state governors to reconcile the country, but it was rejected.

On the morning of 11 January, more troops near the capital joined the Plan of Tacubaya. Comonfort resolved to go with 5,000 loyal troops to the headquarters of the constitutionalists. He intended to step down from the government and hand over the presidency to his constitutional successor, the president of the Supreme Court, who was Benito Juárez. Comonfort released him from his imprisonment, and Juárez left for Guanajuato where on 19 January, he established a government.

== Exile, return and death ==
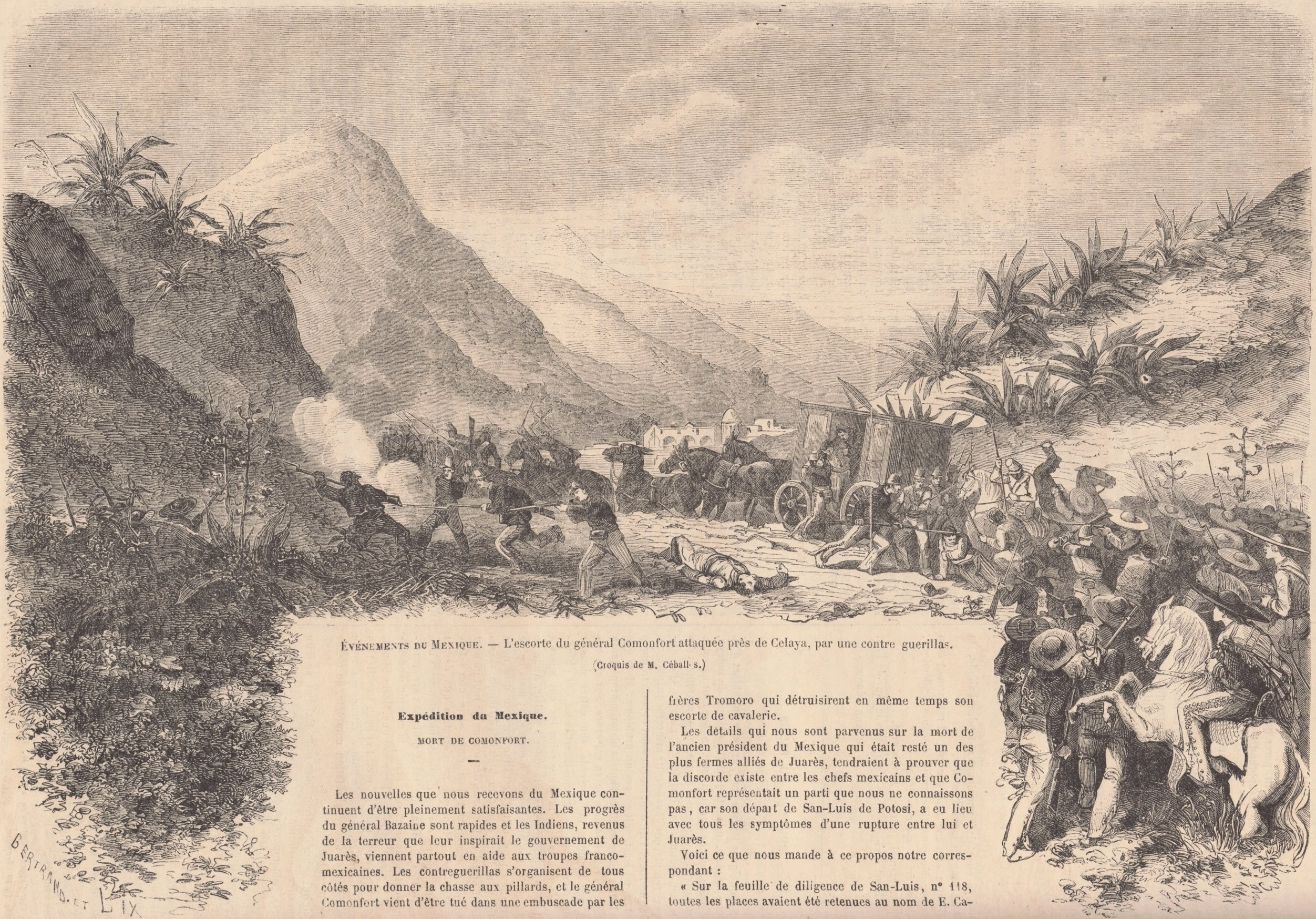
Lithograph portraying the death and ambush of Comonfort.

After being advised by Generals Rangel and Pardo that resistance in the capital was futile, Comonfort sought to abandon the city on the morning of 22 January. The conservative general, Parra, allowed him to leave the city and he headed for the liberal-controlled state of Vera Cruz. On 7 February, he disembarked on the steamer Tennessee and headed towards Europe with his family.

In 1861, he was living in Texas and sought through the intermediary of Santiago Vidaurri, permission to return to Mexico. Vidaurri allowed him to reside in Monterrey. The government at first ordered his arrest but then accepted his services as the French Intervention began.

Comonfort had to deal with recently conscripted troops unsuited to stand a fair chance against the French and he was defeated on 8 May 1863, at the Battle of San Lorenzo, retreating to Mexico City. Comonfort followed the national government when it retreated from the capital on 31 May 1863, and he was even made Minister of War.

On 13 November, he was heading from San Luis Potosí to Guanajuato when he was killed in a surprise attack between Chamacuero and Celaya at the Soria Mill, by a party under the command of Chief Gonzales Aguirre. His corpse was taken to San Miguel de Allende, and after the republic was restored in 1867 his ashes were taken to the cemetery of San Fernando.

== See also ==
- List of heads of state of Mexico
- Liberalism in Mexico
