= National Library of Mexico =

National Library in Mexico City, Mexico

- Biblioteca Nacional de México
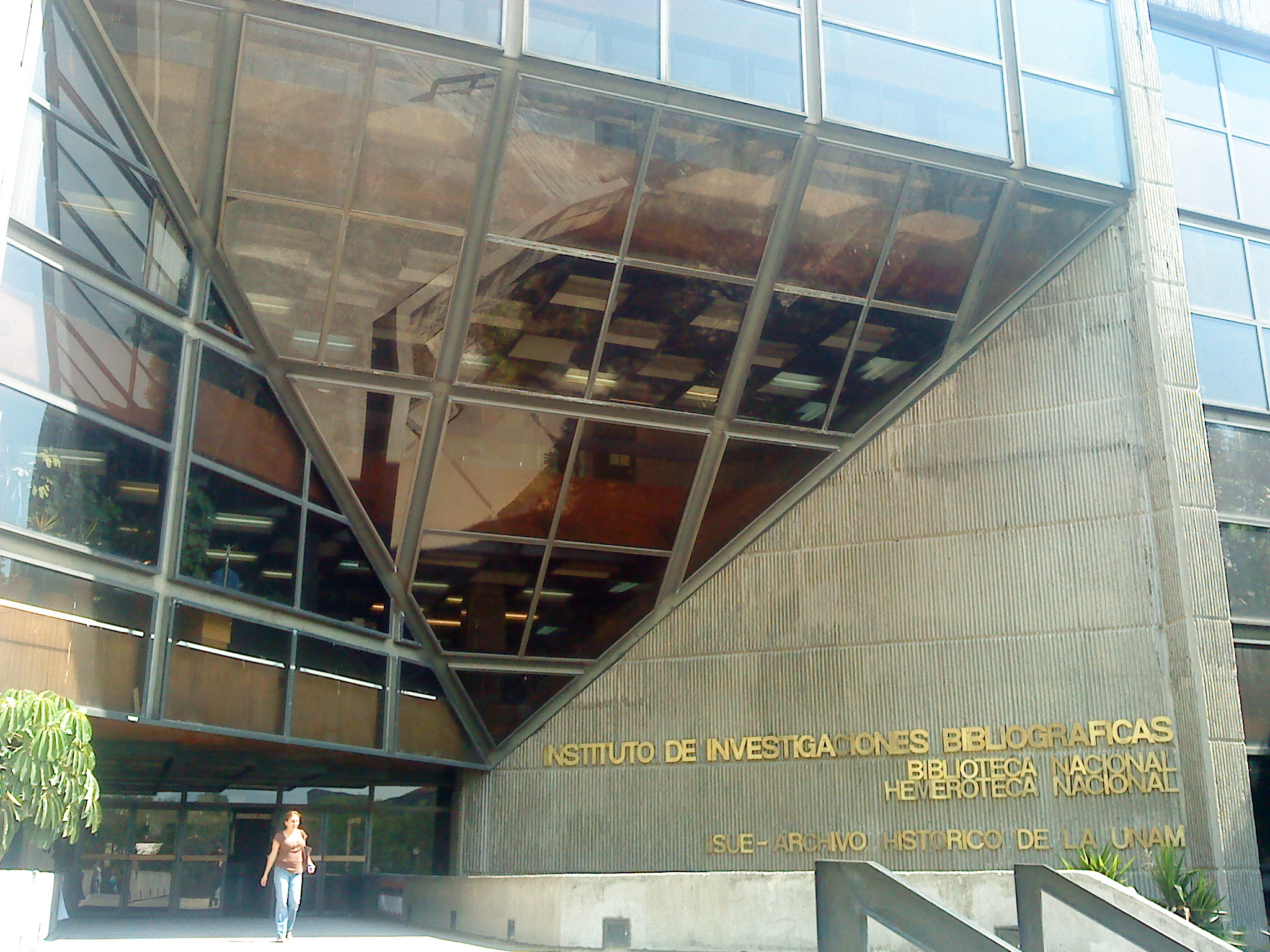
- Entrance of the Library
- 19.3162°N 99.1849°W
- Location: Mexico City, Mexico, Mexico
- Type: National library
- Established: 30 November 1867; 158 years ago
- Reference to legal mandate: 1867 Decree

Collection
- Items collected: Books, periodicals, newspapers, microfiche
- Legal deposit: Yes

Other information
- Director: María Andrea Giovine Yáñez
- Website: bnm.iib.unam.mx

The National Library of Mexico (Spanish: Biblioteca Nacional de México) is located in Ciudad Universitaria, the main campus of the National Autonomous University of Mexico (UNAM) in Mexico City. It was first established on November 30, 1867.

As a national library it is the preeminent bibliographic repository of Mexico and is subject to legal deposit. It also attempts to acquire all foreign books published about Mexico. Its collection of 1,250,000 documents, including books, maps and recordings makes it one of the largest libraries in Mexico and Latin America.

Newspapers and other periodicals are archived in the National Newspaper Library of Mexico (Hemeroteca Nacional de México) located also in Ciudad Universitaria, next to the facilities of the National Library.

== History ==
The collections of the Pontifical and Royal University of México (predecessor of modern UNAM) formed the initial endowment of the National Library after the University's dissolution. The decree establishing the National Library came into force on October 26, 1833. Further decrees in 1846 and 1857 attempted to clarify the scope and functions of the Library.

Benito Juárez issued a decree on November 30, 1867, in which the National Library acquired most of its modern prerogatives, including legal deposit. Also, this same decree relocated the Library to the Church of Saint Augustine in downtown Mexico City.

In 1914 the National Library was linked to the National Autonomous University of Mexico. When the University achieved autonomy in 1929 the Library formed a constituent part of it. The Institute of Bibliographic Investigation was established by the University in 1967 in order to facilitate the administration of the National Library.

The National Library moved to its current location in the UNAM campus of Ciudad Universitaria in 1979. However the Reserves Collection (see below) stayed in a special room at St. Agustine's Church. The building was damaged during the 1985 earthquake and as a consequence it was decided to build a new annex to the current National Library building. The new annex was inaugurated in 1993.

== Services ==
Many of the Library's services are available to the general public. These include an open consultation room for books and CD-ROMs, as well as separate rooms for maps, didactic materials, audio and video recordings, and a room with resources for blind users. Most documents available in these rooms can be partially reproduced on demand at low cost in the Library's facilities.

The Library additionally offers cataloguing and book preservation services. Guided tours through the facilities are available upon request.

=== Reserves Collection ===
The Reserves Collection (Fondo Reservado) stores the most valuable documents owned by the Library. This collection is available only to researchers and comprises about 200,000 documents. It is divided in four sections:

1. Rare and valuable works: includes 170 incunabula, including a 1498 edition of Dante's Divine Comedy. It also has copies of the first books printed in Mexico, of which the oldest in existence are Recognitio summularum and Dialéctica resolutio by Alonso de la Veracruz. Additionally, the Lafragua Collection contains several volumes documenting the social and economic history of Mexico between 1576 and 1924.
2. Archives, manuscripts and imagery: contains manuscripts and archives produced by several figures and institutions of Mexican history. It also has a collection of photographs, paintings and engravings known as the Iconoteca.
3. Original collection (Fondo de Origen): comprises 95,000 documents, most of which were printed in Europe between 1501 and 1821.
4. Special collections: these include private collections and personal libraries either acquired through donations or purchased by the Library. Notable collections include those that belonged to Mario Colín Sánchez, María Asúnsolo, Ángel Pola, Gabino Barreda and others.

== See also ==
- List of libraries in Mexico
- Biblioteca de México José Vasconcelos
