= Payno =

Payno is a surname. Notable people with the surname include:

- Manuel Payno (1810–1894), Mexican writer, journalist, politician and diplomat
- Marta Arce Payno (born 1977), Spanish judo competitor

== See also ==
- Payno, an alias of Liam Payne, English singer and songwriter
