= Los bandidos de Río Frío =

Los bandidos de Río Frío may refer to:

- Los bandidos de Río Frío, the 1889–1891 serialized novel by Manuel Payno
- The Bandits of Cold River (Spanish: Los bandidos de Río Frío), a 1956 Mexican western film
- Los bandidos del río frío (TV series), a 1976 Mexican telenovela
