= Newspaper library =

Type of library

A newspaper library is a building, room, or website where newspapers, magazines, and other periodicals are stored, organized, preserved, and classified. It also refers to the collection or set of newspapers, magazines, and other journalistic publications in a specific document.

It usually corresponds to a section of a library, but it also includes the collections or holdings of the media outlets that publish them.

== Newspaper Libraries ==
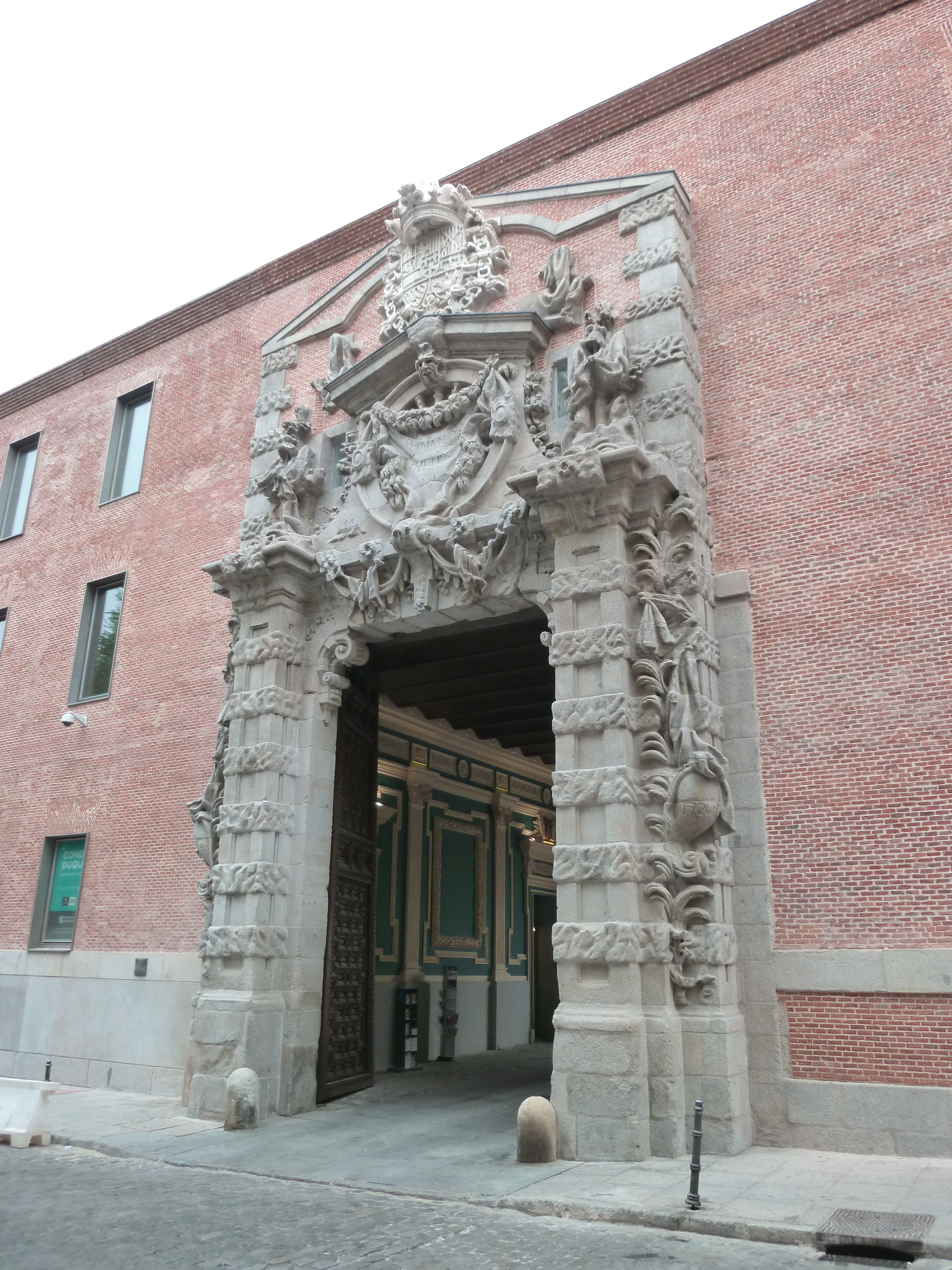
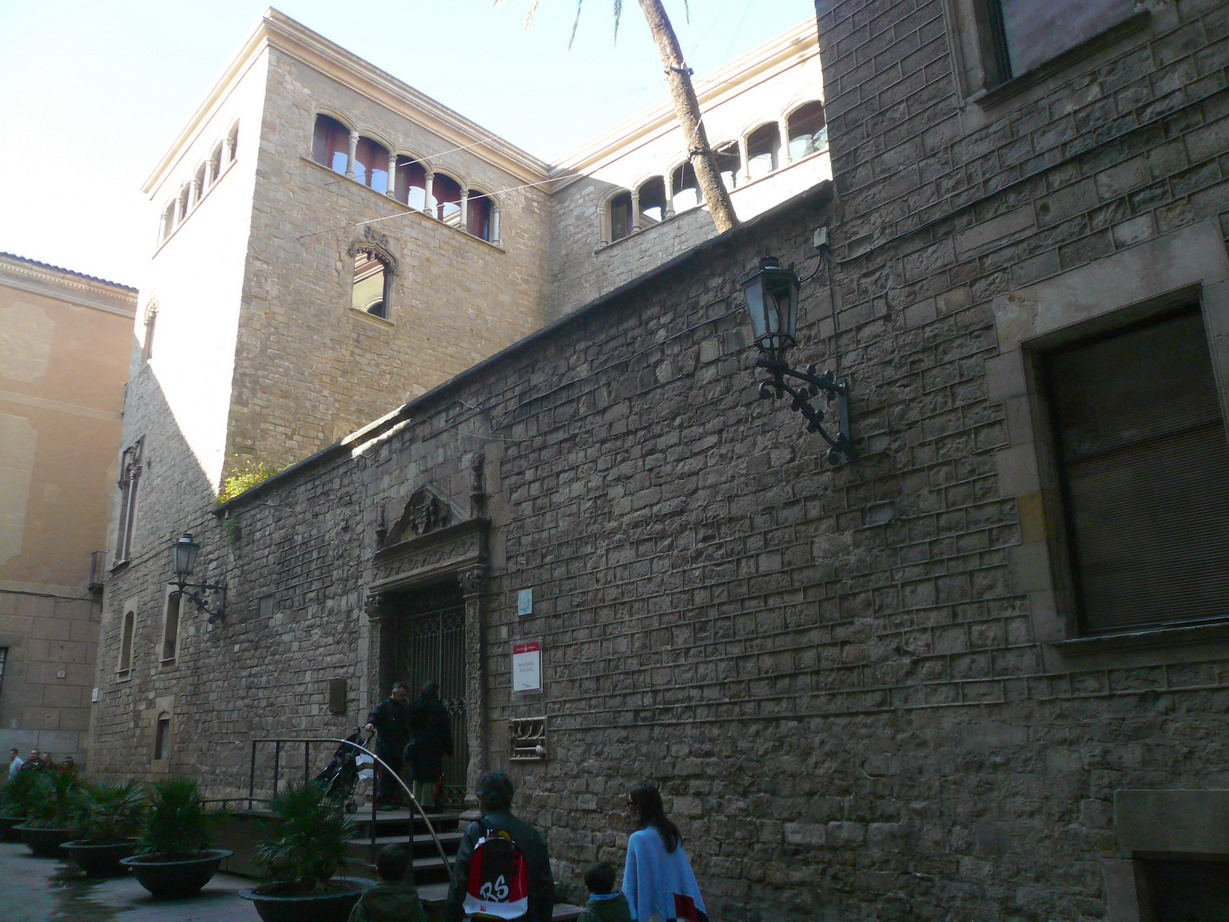
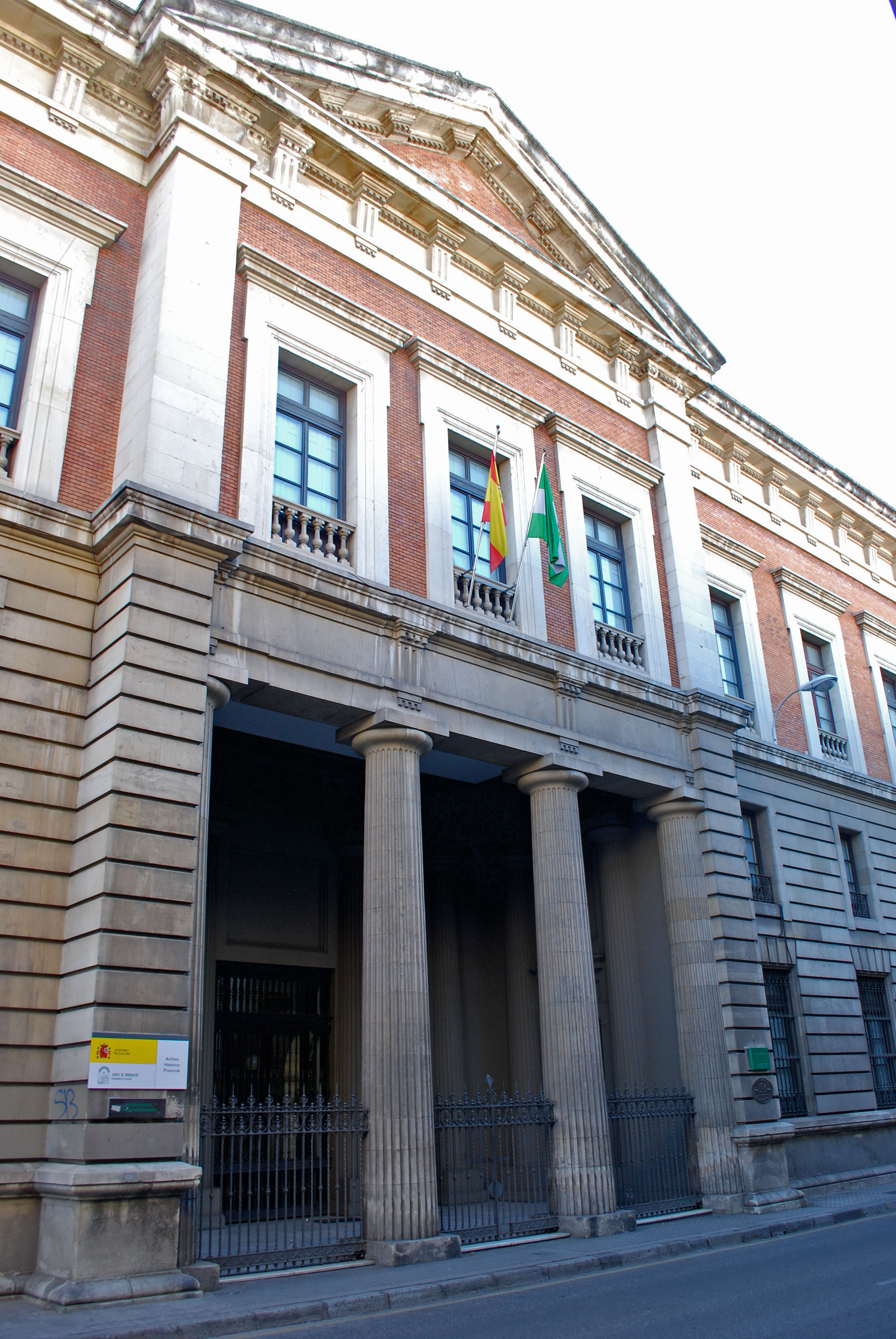
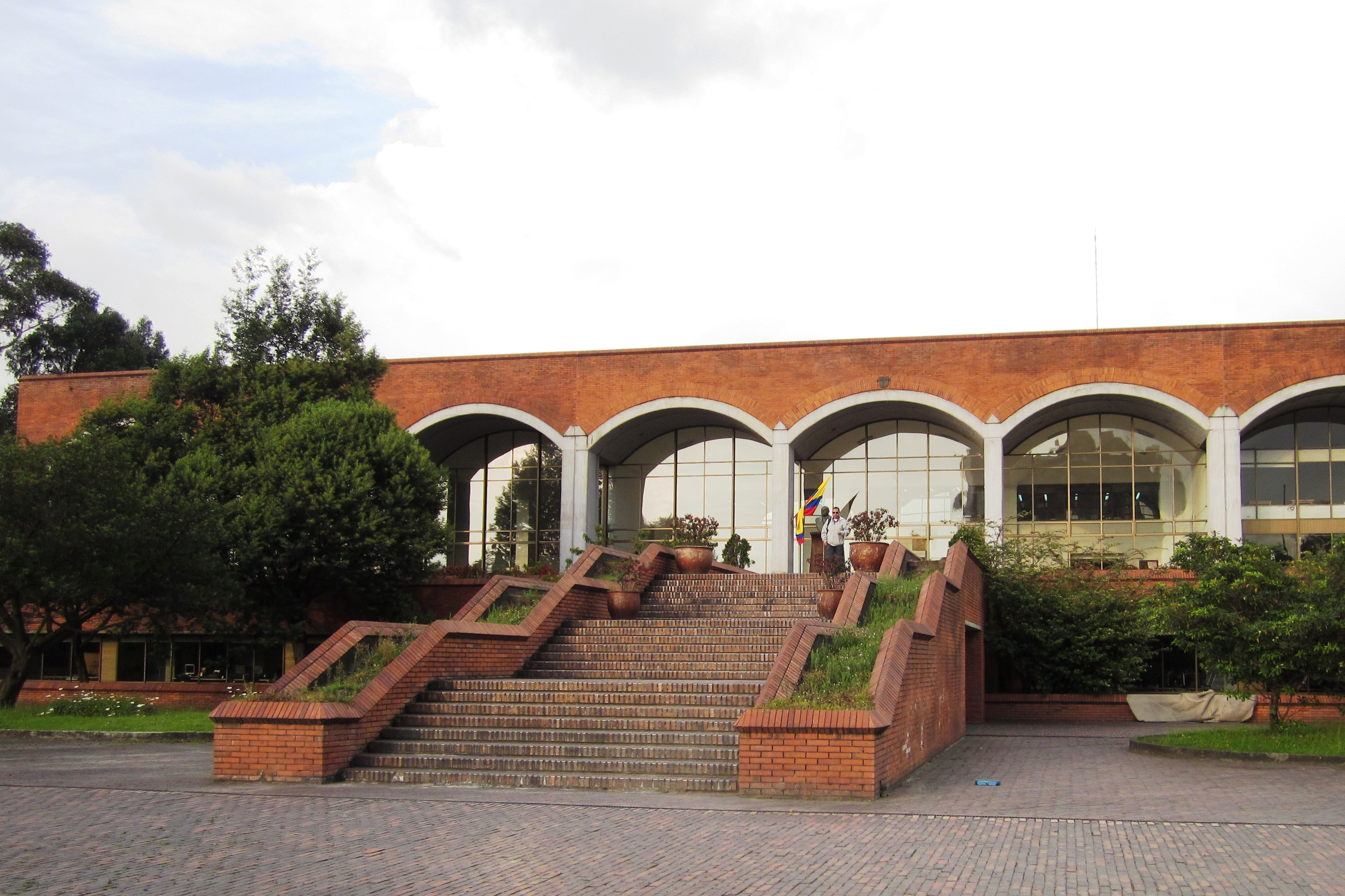
Name	Location	Coordinates	Opened	Type	Established	Edifice
Municipal Newspaper Library of Madrid	Cuartel del Conde Duque Madrid	40°25′39″N 3°42′40.13″W	1916	Municipal general	Since the 15th century
Arxiu Històric de la Ciutat de Barcelona	Casa del l'Ardiaca Barcelona		1928	Municipal general	Since the 18th century
Hemeroteca "Ezequiel Martínez Estrada"	National Library of Argentina Buenos Aires		1932	National general	Since the 19th century
Hemeroteca Municipal de Sevilla	Alcázar, Seville	37°23′33″N 5°59′19″W	1934	Municipal general	Since the 17th century
National Newspaper Library of Mexico	Centro Cultural Universitario, Ciudad Universitaria, Delegación Coyoacán Mexico City		1944	National general	Since the 18th century
Hemeroteca Nacional Universitaria	Avenida El Dorado Bogotá		1994	National general
Hemeroteca da Biblioteca Mário de Andrade	Rua Dr. Bráulio Gomes, 125 São Paulo, Brazil		2012	Municipal, international collection	Since the 19th century
