= José María Lafragua =

Mexican politician

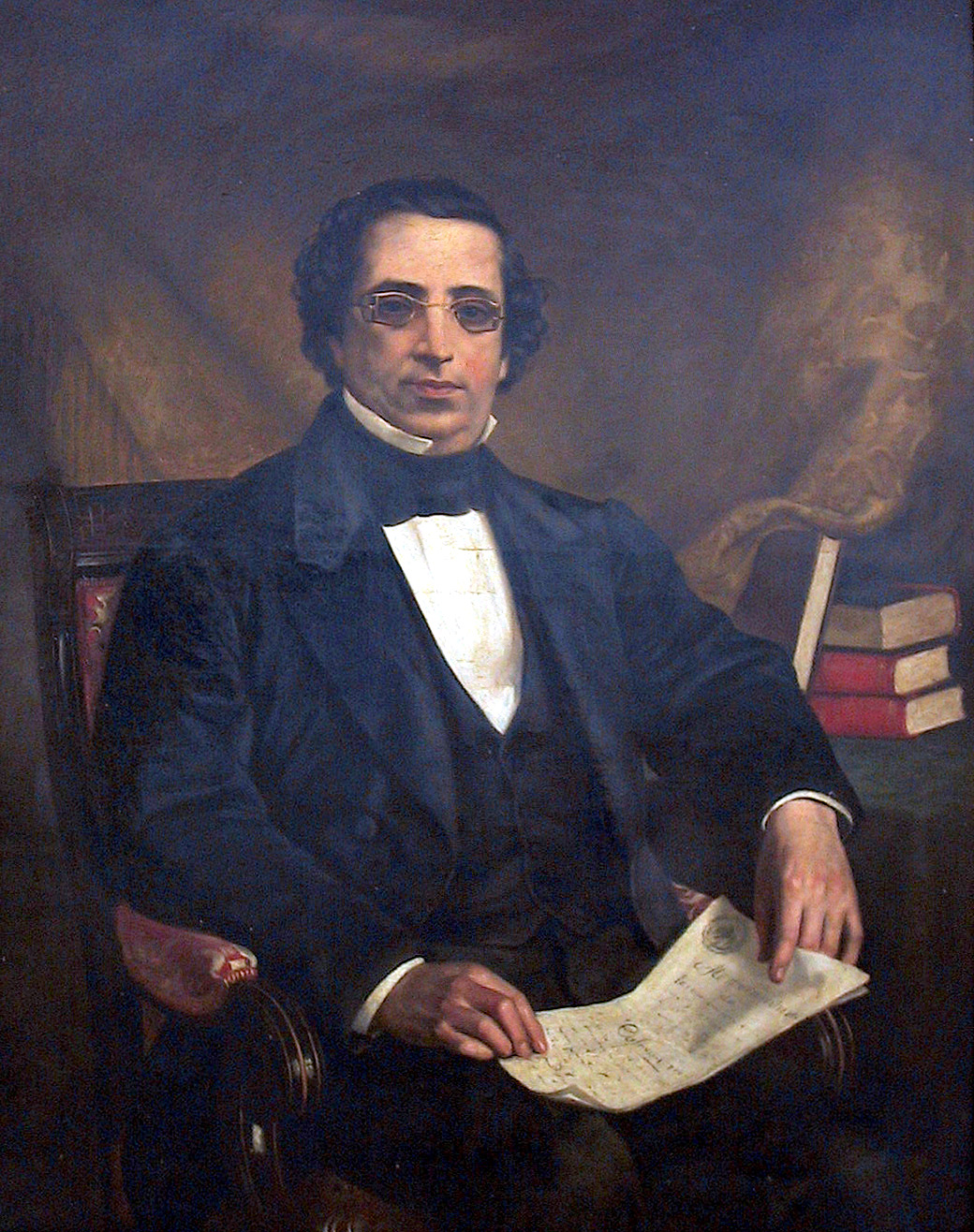

6th Minister of the Interior
- In office 13 December 1855 – 31 January 1857
- President: Ignacio Comonfort
- Preceded by: Francisco de P. Cendejas
- Succeeded by: Ignacio de la Llave

Personal details
- Born: José María Lafragua Ibarra; 2 April 1813 Puebla, New Spain
- Died: 15 November 1875 (aged 62) Mexico City, Mexico
- Party: Liberal
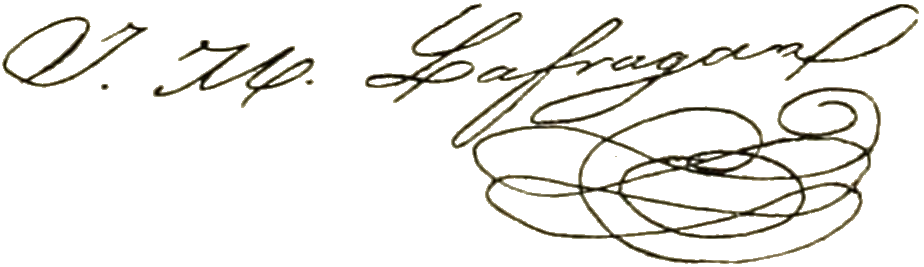
- Signature

José María Lafragua Ibarra was a Mexican liberal lawyer, politician, diplomat, and writer. He was born in Puebla, 2 April 1813, the son of Lt. Col. José María Lafragua and Mariana de Ibarra and Veytia. He served in as Minister of Interior in the government of liberal President Ignacio Comonfort. He was the first director of the National Library of Mexico and key author of the Mexican Civil and Penal Codes.

== Early life ==
His father died when he was 20 days old, leaving his family in a precarious economic situation. He studied in the Colegio de San Luis, and when he was 11, he entered the Colegio Carolino. A year later, in 1825, he received a scholarship to continue his studies. During those years, he was a clerk. The camera's own bishop granted him protection. Through him he met important people, as well as gained access to the Library Palafoxiana.

Lafragua was Secretary of the State College (formerly known as Real Colegio Carolino) and librarian in his first year in law at the Bar, where he was one of the founders.

In his youth he frequented the circle of followers of liberal Miguel Ramos Arizpe, from whom he received significant political influence and ideology. In 1834 he wrote articles on the political scene in The Liberator. In 1835 he became the first lawyer from that institution, although he was professor of civil law while still a student.

== Politics ==
When he finished his studies he joined the Federalist Party and the York Rite Masonic Lodge. In 1838 he published the first writers magazine, Puebla "The Literary essay", and followed with El Leonidas, which had a political slant. In 1839 he moved to Mexico City and wrote for The Cosmopolitan until 1841 when they decided to restart The Pointer in Mexico and The Bee Poblana in Puebla.

In 1842 Lafragua was a Member of the Constituent Congress of Puebla. He proposed and drafted the Civil Code and Civil Procedure and participated in drafting the Penal Code and the bill of individual rights. He was Foreign Minister in the governments of Ignacio Comonfort, Benito Juárez and Sebastián Lerdo de Tejada. In 1860 he was chargé d'affaires in Spain, returning from Europe in 1861.

He was director of the National Library of Mexico appointed by President Benito Juárez in 1867. He died on 15 November 1875.

== Legacy ==
His personal library consisted of more than 4,300 volumes. Highlighting his collection were books and documents on the history of law, lyrics, sciences, and America and Mexico. These books were donated to the National Library of Mexico and the library of Autonomous University of Puebla.
