= Plan of Tacubaya =

Screed by Mexican general Félix Zuloaga against the Constitution of 1857

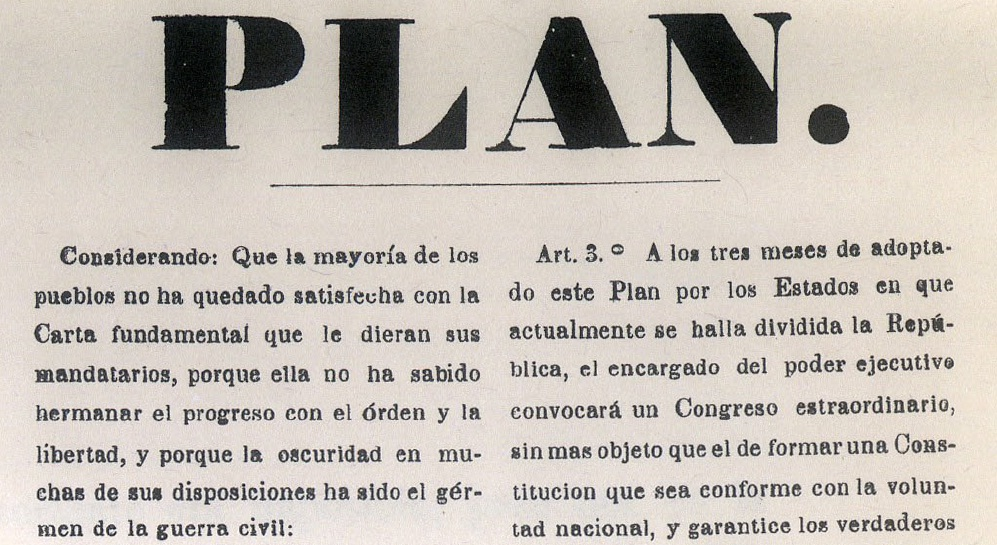
Plan of Tacubaya, Tacubaya, Mexico City, Mexico.

The Plan of Tacubaya (Spanish: Plan de Tacubaya), sometimes called the Plan of Zuloaga, was issued by conservative Mexican General Félix Zuloaga on 17 December 1857 in Tacubaya against the liberal Constitution of 1857. The plan nullified the Constitution while it continued to recognize the election of moderate liberal Ignacio Comonfort as President. Conservatives had fiercely objected to the Constitution of 1857, which abolished special privileges (fueros) of the Catholic Church and the Mexican Army. President Ignacio Comonfort had not been a strong supporter of the Constitution and joined with Zuloaga, commander of the garrison in Mexico City. Although Comonfort sought to reach a compromise with the conservatives, he was deposed in a coup led by Zuloaga on December 11,1857.

Three months after some Mexican states accepted the Plan, the executive called a special session of Congress whose sole mission was to draft a new constitution. The new constitution would be submitted to the electorate for approval where, if ratified, would be promulgated, but if not, it would be redrafted. Its final provision was "all the authorities who do not declare in favor of this Plan shall be discharged." The Congress elected under the new constitution was closed. Comonfort hoped that "by assuming dictatorial powers he could hold the extremists on both sides in check and pursue a middle course." Liberals in Guanajuato and Querétaro did not second the Plan, and in Veracruz, liberals repudiated it. There would be no middle way. Although formally dissolved, congressmen passed a resolution calling for defense of the Constitution. Zuloaga then repudiated Comonfort on 11 January 1858, which led to a three-year civil war between conservatives and liberals.

Support the Plan of Tacubaya No support for the Plan of Tacubaya Neutral

== Presidents of Mexico, recognized by conservatives 1857-1862 ==
President	Took office	Left office	Notes
Ignacio Comonfort (1812–1863)	December 17, 1857	January 21, 1858	After the declaration of Plan of Tacubaya, Congress declared that he was no longer president but he was recognized by conservatives as president with absolute powers.
Félix María Zuloaga (1813–1898)	January 11, 1858	December 24, 1858	After repudiating Comonfort, Zuloaga was appointed president by the Conservative Party.
Manuel Robles Pezuela (1817–1862)	December 24, 1858	January 23, 1859	He assumed the conservative presidency with the support of the Plan de Navidad.
Félix María Zuloaga (1813–1898)	January 24, 1859	February 1, 1859	He was restored to the presidency by a counter-rebellion led by Miguel Miramón.
Miguel Miramón (1831–1867)	February 2, 1859	August 13, 1860	He assumed the conservative presidency as a substitute when Zuloaga left office.
José Ignacio Pavón (1791–1866)	August 13, 1860	August 15, 1860	As president of the Supreme Court of the conservative government, he took office for two days when Miramón left office.
Miguel Miramón (1831–1867)	August 15, 1860	December 24, 1860	He took office as interim president of the conservative government after he was elected by a group of "Representatives of the States" who supported the conservatives. He was defeated at the Battle of Calpulalpan, resigned the presidency and fled the country.
Félix María Zuloaga (1813–1898)	May 23, 1860	December 28, 1862	Despite having been defeated, the conservatives appointed Zuloaga as president until December 28, when they recognized the Regency who was seeking to reestablish the Mexican Empire.

== See also ==
- Reform War
