= National Newspaper Library of Mexico =

Library in Mexico City, Mexico

- Hemeroteca Nacional de México
- 19.316656°N 99.184679°W
- Location: Coyoacán, Mexico City, Mexico
- Type: Newspaper Library
- Established: March 28, 1944; 82 years ago
- Branch of: National Autonomous University of Mexico

Other information
- Director: Pablo Mora Pérez-Tejada

The National Newspaper Library of Mexico (Spanish: Hemeroteca Nacional de México), better known by the acronym HNM, is a public newspaper library in Mexico. It was founded on March 28, 1944 by the then rector of the National Autonomous University of Mexico (UNAM) Rodulfo Brito Foucher and Mexican president Manuel Ávila Camacho, in the old temple of San Pedro and San Pablo, whose remodeling was overseen by architects Jorge Medellín and Alfonso Pallares to house such a headquarters.
