= Félix María Zuloaga =

President of Mexico from 1858 from 1859, from 1860 to 1862

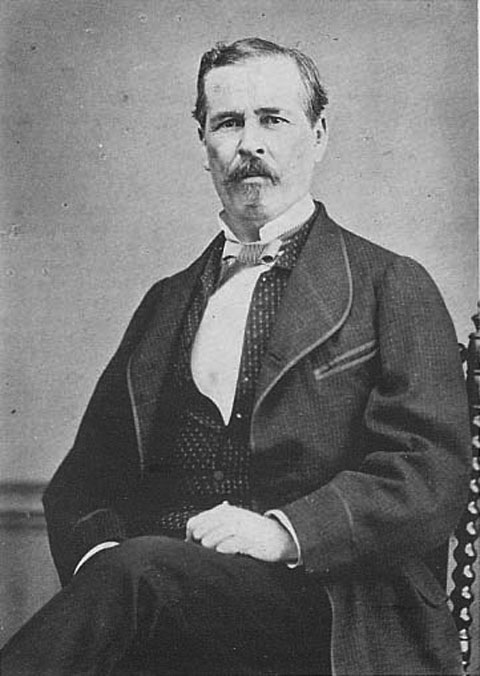

27th President of Mexico by the Plan of Tacubaya
- In office 23 January 1858 – 24 December 1858
- Preceded by: Ignacio Comonfort
- Succeeded by: Manuel Robles Pezuela
- In office 24 January 1859 – 2 February 1859
- Preceded by: Manuel Robles Pezuela
- Succeeded by: Miguel Miramón
- In office 24 December 1860 – 28 December 1862
- Preceded by: Miguel Miramón
- Succeeded by: Regency of the Mexican Empire

Personal details
- Born: 31 March 1813 Álamos, Sonora, New Spain
- Died: 11 February 1898 (aged 84) Mexico City
- Party: Conservative Party

Félix María Zuloaga Trillo (31 March 1813 – 11 February 1898) was a Mexican conservative general and politician who played a key role in the outbreak of the Reform War in early 1860, a war which would see him elevated to the presidency of the nation. President Zuloaga was unrecognized by, and fought against, the liberal supporters of President Benito Juárez.

Zuloaga's forces quickly gained control over the capital, and the central states of the nation, winning every major engagement during the first year of the war, and even temporarily capturing Juárez and his entire cabinet, but in the end, the liberals were not decisively defeated, still controlled large parts of the nation's periphery, and Juárez remained securely entrenched in the strategic port of Veracruz.

In December 1858, a moderate faction of the conservatives overthrew Zuloaga, hoping to come to a compromise with Juárez. Manuel Robles Pezuela then ascended to the presidency. The liberal government rejected all offers of compromise, and the conservatives then elected Miguel Miramón as president. The ousted Zuloaga, still clinging to his claims of the presidency, endorsed Miramon's election and officially passed the presidency on to him.

Zuloaga remained somewhat active in Miramón's government but eventually retired from the scene. He emerged after the war ended to claim the presidency while conservative guerillas were still active in the countryside, but this came to nothing, and Zuloaga subsequently left the country. He would return during the Second Mexican Empire, but unlike many of his conservative colleagues, Zuloaga played no political or military role within the Empire. After the fall of the Empire in 1867, Zuloaga was exiled to Cuba and returned to civilian life, eventually returning to Mexico, where he lived until his death in 1895.

== Early life ==
Felix Zuloaga was born on 31 March 1813 in Álamos, Sonora. He was born to Manuel Jose De Zuloaga and María Anna Gertrudis Vitala Trillo.

On 8 October 1834, he received the rank of colonel of the national guard and was engaged in campaigns against Indians until 1837, when he left the department of Chihuahua, having previously been granted the rank of lieutenant of engineers.

He defended the government during the Federalist Revolt of 1840, during which a group of militants seized the National Palace and took President Anastasio Bustamante hostage in order to try and overthrow the government and restore the Constitution of 1824. The following year he joined the Bases of Tacubaya which intended to revise the then current constitution, the Siete Leyes. He was promoted to captain on 5 November 1841 and fought in Yucatán during the Caste War, after which he moved to Tabasco and was granted the rank of lieutenant colonel.

During the Mexican–American War, he was in charge of fortifications in Monterrey and in Saltillo, and in 1847 contributed to setting up the defenses on the route from Veracruz to Mexico City.

In July 1848, he retired to Chihuahua where he was elected alderman in 1852 and remained in that post until March, 1853 when he returned to service in the military. In November he was promoted to colonel and was named president of the council of war for judging thieves at which post he remained for a few months. In the following two years he served the Santa Anna's campaign against the liberal revolutionaries of the south led by Juan Álvarez. He fell prisoner at the Hacienda de Nuzco, and the rebel commander Ignacio Comonfort protected him from being sent to a firing squad and actually recruited him to join the liberal cause. When the Plan of Ayutla triumphed, and Santa Anna's dictatorship was overthrown, Zuloaga was given command of Comonfort's forces and assigned to the campaign of Sierra de Querétaro.

== La Reforma ==
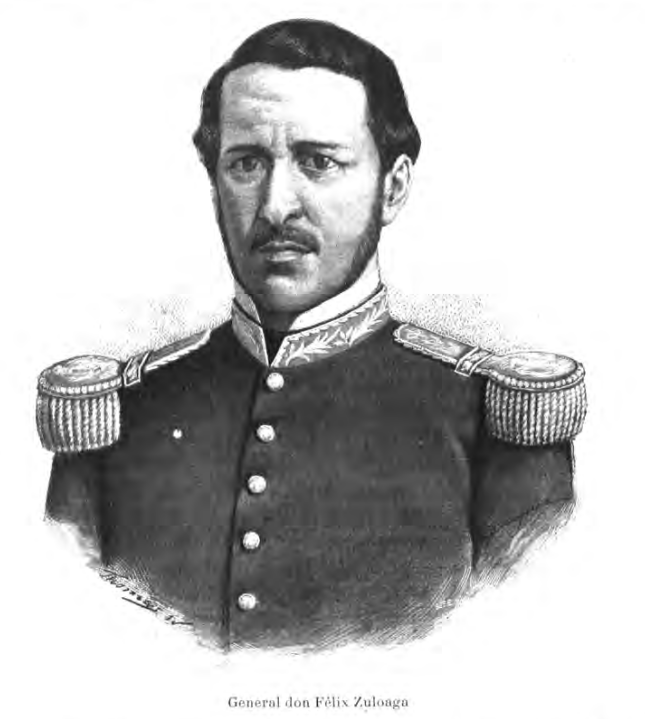
A young Zuloaga

Zuloaga's old commander Ignacio Comonfort ascended to the presidency in December, 1856, and proceeded to administer over one of the most eventful presidencies in 19th century Mexican history. A convention finished drafting a new constitution for the nation in early 1857, only to encounter extreme opposition from conservatives over its unprecedented reforms aimed against the army and the church. Most notable was the opposition to the constitutional codification of the Ley Lerdo, a law which forced collective entities to forcibly sell their properties, affecting both the Catholic Church in Mexico, and Mexico's Indigenous communities, who had a tradition of farming on communal lands. Further controversy was inflamed when the government mandated that all civil servants swear an oath to the constitution or lose their jobs. Many Catholics did refuse the oath, but those who did not were excommunicated.

Zuloaga was initially loyal to the moderate liberal government of Ignacio Comonfort. He helped command a government effort to put down a conservative rebellion in Puebla. As tensions over the constitution rose, Comonfort left the capital and temporarily resided in Tacubaya where his defenses were commanded by Zuloaga.

However, by December, Zuloaga was among those being suspected of plotting against the government, and he was even indicted.

== Plan of Tacubaya ==
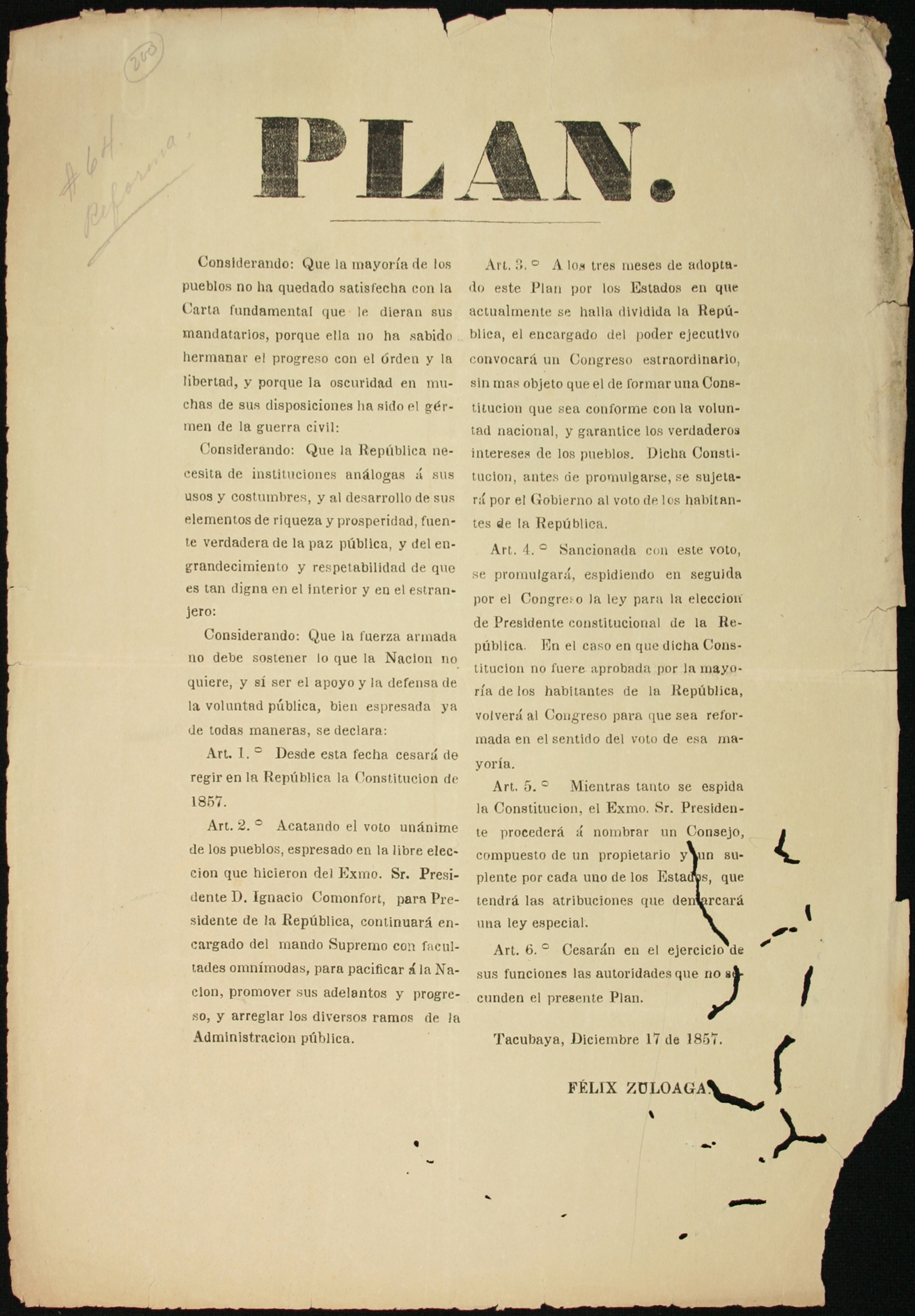
The Plan of Tacubaya as it was published and distributed.

The suspicion was well placed as Zuloaga was plotting with conservative conspirators. After coming to an arrangement with certain governors, the conspirators in a suburb of Mexico City declared the Plan of Tacubaya on the morning of 17 December to set aside the national constitution. The supreme control of the government was to be entrusted to Ignacio Comonfort who was to convoke within three months another constitutional congress for framing another constitution more in line with the national will, to be submitted to a national plebiscite and in the event of its non acceptance to be returned to the congress for an amendment. The president was tso rule with a consultative council composed of one representative from each state.

On 17 December, congress made a solemn protest against the Plan of Tacubaya, and declared the Comonfort's authority had now come to an end. Zuloaga's brigade occupied the capital and dissolved the congress. Benito Juarez, president of the Supreme Court and Isidoro Olvera, president of the congress were arrested. The ayuntamiento of Mexico City was also dissolved. On 19 December, Comonfort officially announced that he had accepted the Plan of Tacubaya. He released a manifesto explaining his motives, expounding that he viewed the Plan of Tacubaya as an opportunity for a moderate compromise and viewing the alternative as anarchy.

Seventy deputies reassembled in Querétaro and aired their protests. A council of state was installed on 25 December in which skeptical voices opined that it was impossible to bring about the reconciliating that Comonfort sought. On 30 December, the strategic state of Vera Cruz abandoned the Plan of Tacubaya, convincing Comonfor that his new government's position was precarious. Comonfort would resign, passing the presidency over to Benito Juarez whom Comonfort had also released. He gathered his loyal troops and engaged in skirmishes with the Zuloaga government, but most of the loyal garrison eventually abandoned Comonfort, leading him to flee the capital, and eventually the nation.

== Presidency ==
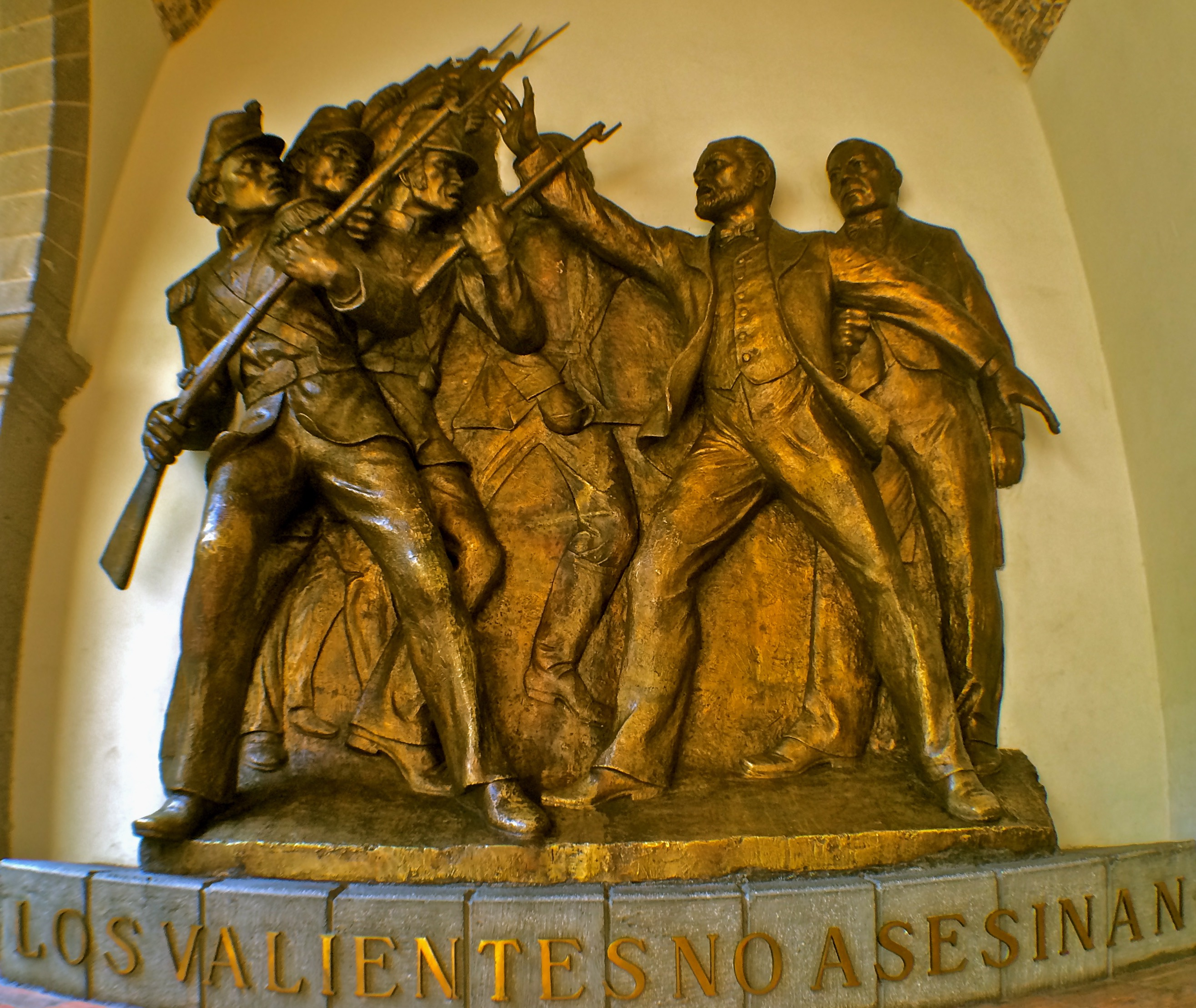
Sculpture portraying Guillermo Prieto saving the life of President Juárez in Guadalajara during the Zuloaga presidency

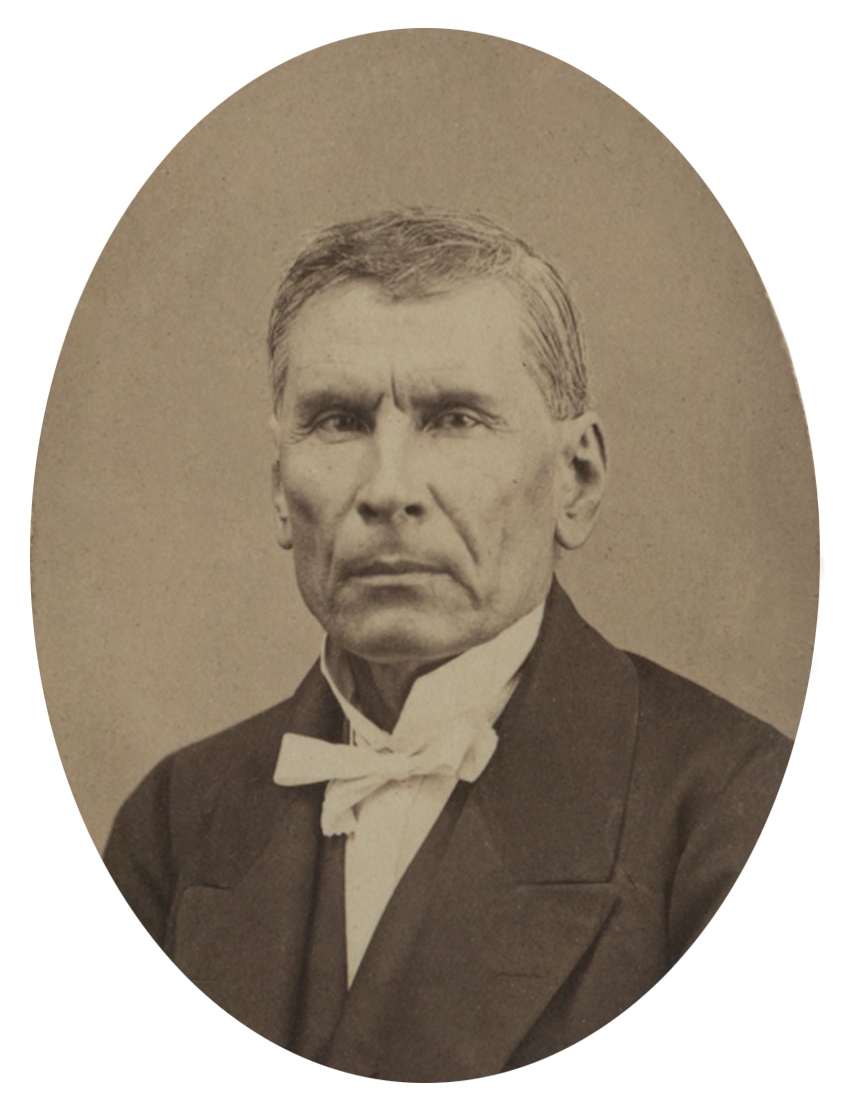
Santiago Vidaurri Liberal commander of the North, during the Reform War.

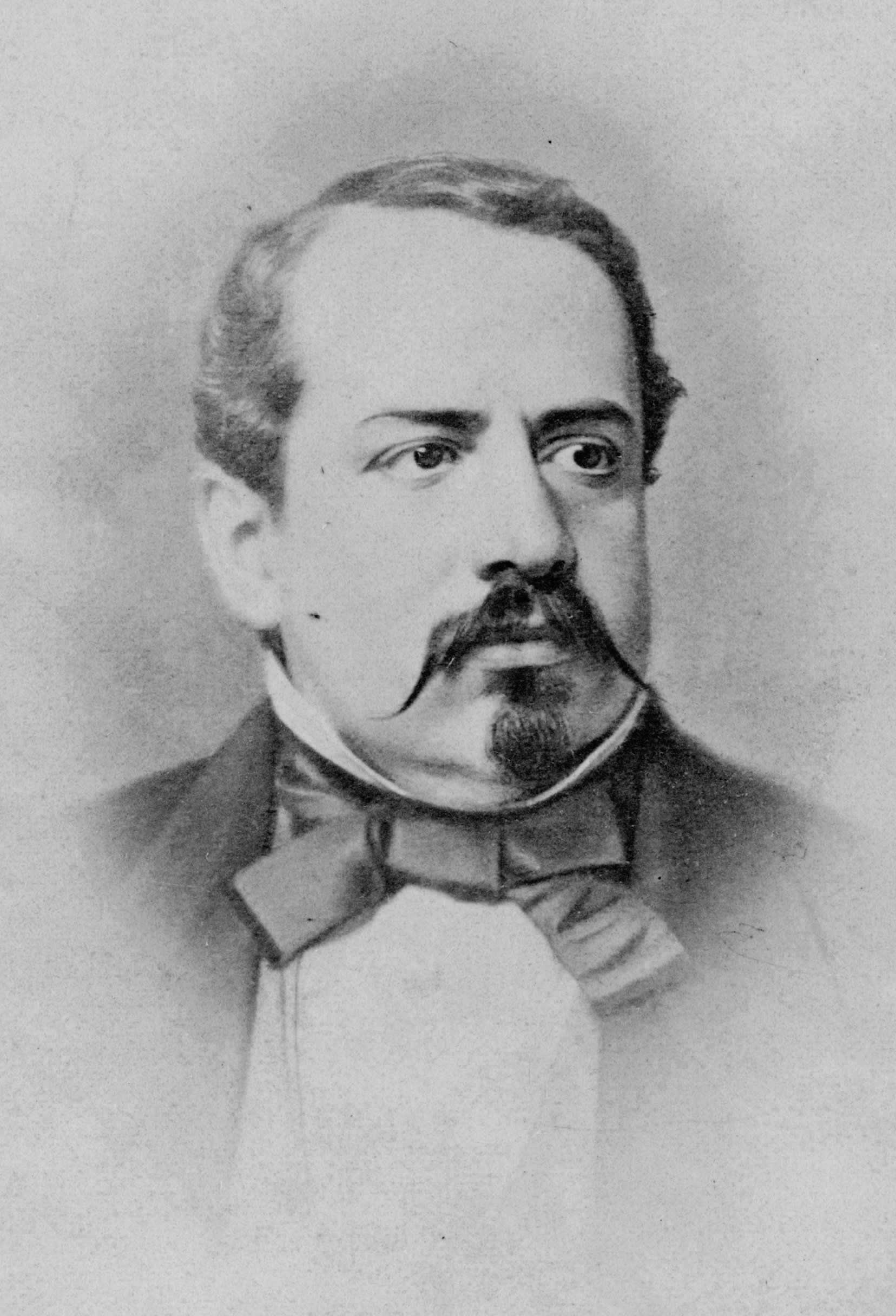
Manuel Robles Pezuela, the moderate Conservative who overthrew Zuloaga in an attempt to compromise with the Liberals.

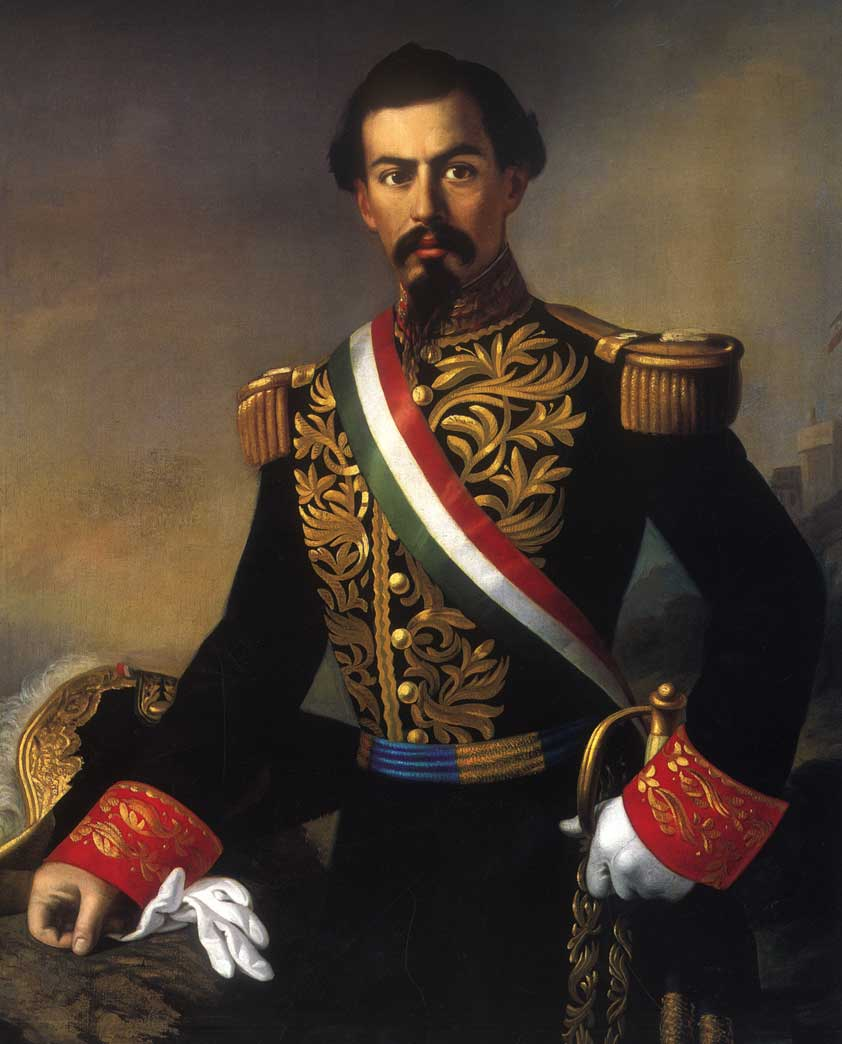
General Miguel Miramón one of the leading Conservative Generals during the Reform War, later to replace Zuloaga as Conservative president.

After triumphing in the minor skirmish with Comonfort, Zuloaga on 21 January, published a manifesto promising order in the capital. He then named the individuals who had been chosen to be a part of the junta that was meant to choose the new head of state according to the Plan of Tacubaya. On the 22nd the junta met in the senate chambers and Felix Zuloaga was chosen by twenty six votes, one vote going to Santa Anna, and one vote going to General Echeagaray. The junta then drafted an oath of office, which Zuloaga read the following day, promising to uphold and protect, independence, religion, and unity between all Mexicans, echoing the promises made in the Plan of Iguala.

The newly established conservative government was recognized by the foreign diplomatic corps at the capital with the exception of the United States.

On the 24th, Zuloaga named his ministers. Luis Gonazaga Cueva was made Minister of the Interior, Hilario Elguero was made Ministry of Government, Manuel Larrainzar was made Minister of Justice and Ecclesiastical Affairs, and Jose de la Parra was made Minister of War, and Jose Hierro Maldonado was made Minister of Development. Zuloaga then named a council of government made up of two representatives from each state.

On 28 January, a decree was published nullifying the Ley Lerdo, and calling for the property which had been seized by the church to be returned. Other decrees published on the same day restored to their former employment all civil servants who had lost their jobs in refusing to swear an oath to the constitution of 1857, and also nullified the Ley Juarez. On 31 January, President Zuloaga directed a letter to Pope Pius IX reaffirming his country's adherence to the Catholic faith.

States were declaring their loyalty to either Juárez or Zuloaga and their respective armies were preparing for war. After hostilities broke out Zuloaga, knowing the strategic importance of Veracruz, tried to win over the governor of the state, Gutierrez Zamora, who however affirmed his support for the government of Juárez. In the meantime liberal forces in the north were being organized by Santiago Vidaurri while Manuel Doblado led a liberal coalition in the interior headquartered in the town of Celaya. On 10 March 1858, the liberals lost the Battle of Salamanca, which opened up the interior of the country to the conservatives.

Juárez at this point was in Guadalajara, when part of the army there mutinied and imprisoned him, at one point threatening his life, until fellow liberal minister and prisoner Guillermo Prieto dissuaded the hostile soldiers from shooting Juárez. As rival factions struggled to control the city, Juárez and other liberal prisoners were released on agreement after which Guadalajara was fully captured by conservatives by the end of March. Juárez now made Santos Degollado the head of his armies, and then decided to head towards Veracruz, embarking from Manzanillo, crossing Panama, and arriving in Veracruz on 4 May 1858.

On 24 July, Miramón captured Guanajuato, and San Luis Potosi was captured by the conservatives on 12 September. Vidaurri was defeated at the Battle of Ahualulco on 29 September. By October the conservatives were at the height of their strength.

The conservatives controlled the most populous cities of the republic, and the liberal capital of Vera Cruz was cut off from the interior of the country. The liberals however still had the loyalty of significant parts of the north and the south of the country. Juárez was determined to sustain the conflict, entrenched in the strategic port of Vera Cruz, which the conservatives did not have the forces to carry out a naval blockade of.

Despite his significant victories in the first few months of the war, the Zuloaga government's position was far from entirely secure. An attempt to revive the unitary organization of the country by reducing the states to departments as they existed during the Centralist Republic of Mexico, proved to be unpopular. The conservatives were also divided into three factions: the Santanistas, named after supporters of Santa Anna, wanted a more authoritarian government as had exited during the dictatorship of Santa Anna from 1853 to 1855, the Zuloaguistas wanted to retain Zuloaga, and the Fusionists wanted to compromise with the liberals. The Zuloaga government was also struggling to find funds, the contributions of the clergy, forced loans, and increased tariffs not being sufficient to sustain government expenses. The seizure of property was irritating both citizens and foreigners.

The Plan of Tacubaya had called for a congress to be summoned in order to draft a constitution, but this was proving to be impractical in the middle of the war. Zuloaga's cabinet drafted a provisional constitution.

In July 1858, the failure of achieving a final victory over the liberals led to a shuffling of the cabinet. Joaquin Castillo y Lanzas was named Minister of Relations. Fernandez de Jauregui was made Minister of Government, Javier Miranda was made Minister of Justice, J. M. Garcia was made Minister of War, Pedro Jorrin was made Minister of the Treasury, and Jose M. Zaldivar was made Minister of Development. A law against conspirators was passed along with restrictions on the press.

The conservatives kept achieving victory and on 24 July, Miramón captured Guanajuato. Some moderate liberals now wished to compromise with the conservatives. On 29 September, the conservatives won a significant victory at Ahuahulco against Santigo Vidaurri. By October, 1858, the conservatives were at the height of their strength.

In early November, Zuloaga's minister of Government Jarequi offered to resign but it was not accepted. The liberals then took Guadalajara causing alarm in Mexico City. Zulaoga was holding frequent conferences with the British and French foreign representatives, and the two powers showed themselves disposed to help blockade Juárez. Juarez, however had long gained the good will of the United States, whose minister Forsyth had refused to recognize Zuloaga's government.

On 20 December 1858, about a year since he first came to power, Zuloaga had to face a pronunciamiento against himself. Echeagaray pronounced at Ayutla with a plan to summon a congress to frame a constitution suitable for the nation. Zuloaga passed measures to put down the revolt, assuming personal command of the forces at the capital, and forbidding all interaction with the rebels. He passed a manifesto condemning Echeagaray who was stripped of his post in the army. Manuel Doblado was also arrested.

A modified form of the Ayotla Plan was proclaimed by Manuel Robles Pezula on 23 December, and found some military support in the capital. Zuloaga offered to resign if the objection was to him personally, but would not assent if the plan was meant to overthrow his conservative principles. Miramón was offered command of the plan, but he rejected it.

As loyal troops kept defecting, Zuloaga resigned before midnight and sought asylum with the British legation in spite of the insurgents promises to keep Zuloaga unharmed. The Plan of Ayotla was actually an offshoot of the aforementioned fusionist party, a moderate faction, which did not seek to abandon conservative principles, but did seek an end to the war by seeking compromise with the liberals. Manuel Robles Pezuela arrived at the national palace on the morning of 24 December, when he assumed the presidency.

Robles Pezuela sent commissioners out to gain adherence to his plan, and began to assemble a junta of representatives ignoring, however the conservative hero Miguel Miramón, upsetting conservative hardliners. Robles, however eventually conceded in granting Miramón representation.

The Junta assembled on 30 December 1858, and proceeded to elect a president. Miramón won with 50 votes against Robles' 46, though the latter was authorized to act as provisional president until Miramón arrived in the capital.

Meanwhile, Zuloaga had taken back his previous resignation, but due to the circumstances, agreed to officially pass on the presidency to Miramon on 31 January 1859. To keep him from changing his mind, Miramón had him sent to the interior. Zuloaga then left the government.

Miramón would go on to wage the war energetically and make two attempts to capture Juárez's capital at Vera Cruz. His second attempt in March 1860, would see his naval forces intercepted by the U.S. navy which was protecting Juárez. Liberal victories then accumulated until Juárez took back the capital in January 1861, though conservative guerilla's most notably Leonardo Marquez remained active in the countryside.

== Later life ==
It was amidst this situation, with conservative forces still active, that Zuloaga once more publicly emerged in 1861, once more claiming the presidency, but to no effect. He left the country again the following year. He returned to Mexico in August 1864, during the Second Mexican Empire, but no longer played any role in politics. He survived the fall of the Empire but was exiled to Cuba, returning to his country after the death of Benito Juárez. Zuloaga became a tobacco merchant, living until 1895.

== See also ==
- List of heads of state of Mexico
