= Manuel Payno =

Mexican diplomat, politician, journalist and novelist

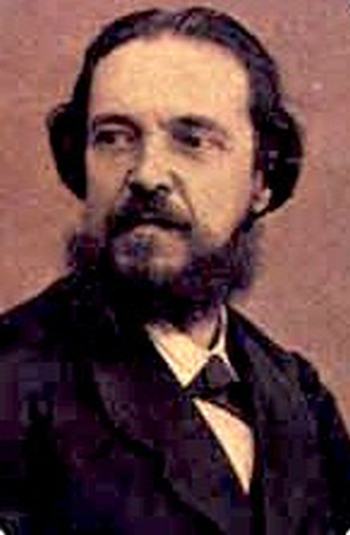
- Born: 21 June 1810; Mexico City, Viceroyalty of New Spain
- Died: 5 November 1894 (aged 84); San Ángel, Mexico City, Mexico
- Occupations: Politician, essayist, novelist, short-story writer
- Writing career
- Genres: Poetry, costumbrism, picaresque, journalism
- Notable works: The Bandits of Río Frio (1889–1891); The Man of the Situation (1861)

Manuel Payno (21 June 1810 – 5 November 1894) was a Mexican writer, journalist, politician and diplomat. His political ideology was moderate liberal. Payno's most notable literature work include Los bandidos de Río Frío ("The Bandits of Río Frio"), a costumbrista novel deemed an iconic piece of Mexican literature that has been an inspiration source for other writers and artists, and also from which several film adaptations have been made.

== Early years and start of political career ==
His father was Manuel Payno Bustamante González, founder of Matamoros Customs, in northern Tamaulipas. Little is known about his mother, some sources cite her name as María Josefa Cruzado Pardo who belonged to prominent family from Puebla. However, some other sources cite her mother's last name as Flores. Payno entered the Matamoros Customs branch as meritorious, along with Guillermo Prieto. In 1840, he served as secretary to General Mariano Arista, and when he achieved a lieutenant colonel rank was chief of a section of the Ministry of War. Subsequently, he managed a tobacco shop.

== War with the United States and Ministry of Finance ==
In 1847, he fought against the U.S. Army during the Mexican-American War, and he established the secret postal service between Mexico City and Veracruz. He was Minister of Finance during José Joaquín de Herrera's administration (1850–1851) and also during the government of Ignacio Comonfort.

== War of Reform and French Intervention ==
Charged with involvement in the coup d'état headed by Félix Zuloaga – absent from the government of Ignacio Comonfort – he was prosecuted and removed from politics. Manuel Payno was also persecuted during the Second French Intervention in Mexico, and he ended up recognizing the government of Maximilian of Habsburg. Once the republic was restored, with Benito Juárez as president, Payno became a deputy.

== Teacher and diplomat ==
Manuel Payno worked as a teacher and taught at the National Preparatory School created by Gabino Barreda. He was a professor at the School of Commerce, where he taught Political Economy. As a senator, in 1882, President Manuel González sent him as an agent to Paris. In 1886 he was appointed consul in Santander, Spain, and subsequently consul general in Spain, establishing his residence in Barcelona. In 1891 he returned to Mexico and in 1892 he was again elected senator, a position he held until his death, on 5 November 1894 in San Ángel, Mexico City. He wrote Tratado de la propiedad. Ensayo de un estudio del Derecho Romano y del Derecho Público y Constitucional en lo relativo a la propiedad. ("Treatise on property. Essay in the study of Roman Law and Public and Constitutional Law in relation to property").

== Writer ==
Payno was active in a wide range of different activities, being also a prominent writer and novelist. A lover of reading, he combined his political activities with those of a journalist and writer. His journalistic work includes historical, political and financial articles, collaborating numerous newspapers. He was a corresponding member of the Royal Spanish Academy. He wrote novels such as El fistol del diablo ("The Devil's Tiepin") (1845–1846), in which he puts fun before moral principles. El hombre de la situación ("The Man of the Situation") (1861), a novel of customs that covers the last years of Viceroyalty of New Spain and the first ones of independent Mexico. In this work the story stands out two main characters which are father and son, one peninsular Spanish (Old World Spanish) and the other Criollo (New World Spanish). A costumbrista novel in which daily life details of society are depicted, comic passages abound in which a very Mexican grace and picaresque stands out.

The novel Los bandidos de Río Frio ("The Bandits of Río Frío") (1889–1891), undoubtedly his masterpiece and most notable work, was written under the pseudonym of "A Mexican creator (ingenio)", during his second stay in Europe. Los bandidos de Río Frío is a recreation of Mexico from the first half of the 19th century. The plot is rich in incidents recorded in real life. Payno considered his work as "naturalistic novel, humorous of customs and crimes and horrors." Payno makes a long description of the environment and setting, including the background of the characters, the events revolve around all social strata of the time, an appropriate pretext to depict potentates, professionals, military, artisans, merchants, Indians, clerics and thieves. The novel also depicts Mexico's cultural and ethnic diversity and the contrasts of lifestyles among social classes and life in the cities and the countryside.

Some other of his works are; Compendio de historia de México ("Compendium of the History of Mexico"), Novelas cortas ("Short Novels"), La España y la Francia ("Spain and France"), El libro rojo ("The Red Book") (co-authored with Vicente Riva Palacio, Juan A. Mateos and Rafael Martínez de la Torre) and La convención española ("The Spanish Convention").

== See also ==
- The Bandits of Cold River, a 1956 motion picture based on Payno's novel
