= Jesús Castillo Rangel =

Mexican revolutionary (1896?–2017)

- Born: 24 October 1896 (claimed); Soconusco
- Died: December 20, 2017

Jesús Castillo Rangel, nicknamed Don Chuchito (Soconusco, Chiapas; October 24, 1896, Nicolás Bravo, Othón P. Blanco, Quintana Roo; December 20, 2017), was a Mexican revolutionary. At the time of his death, at the claimed age of 121 years, he was considered the oldest man in Mexico, a feat registered in the General Archive of the Nation of Mexico.

== Biography ==
=== Early life ===
The Mexican Revolution broke out when Don Jesus was only 14 years old. He later stated "I fought alongside Zapata; but the first days of the Revolution I was a Carrancista military man".

He was part of the troops commanded by Emiliano Zapata, demonstrating his sympathy to the motto slogan "the land belongs to those who work it", and convinced by the hopes of triumph that the revolutionary general transmitted.

=== After the Revolution ===
In 1924, after the revolution, he met his future wife, Fidencia Morales. With her he had two children: Rodolfo and Alfredo. The persecution undertaken by the landowners of the time against those who had taken part in the revolutionary movement, forced the couple to move to Concepción del Oro, a community in the state of Zacatecas. In an effort to keep them safe in Soconusco they left their two children in the care of their acquaintances, of whom they never heard. "My wife and I had to flee, because all of us who participated in the revolution movement were not safe, they even burned our houses."

Jesús and his wife Fidencia stayed in Concepción del Oro for several years, where he dedicated himself to cultivating the land. Later they had to move to Acayucan, Veracruz. Finally, in 1989 they settled permanently in Nicolas Bravo, Quintana Roo.

=== His life in Quintana Roo ===
Don Chuchito, as his neighbors call him, dedicated himself to working on the land until he was 106 years old. In 2012 his wife, Fidencia Morales, died after living 91 years with him.

In 2015, the National Institute for Older Adults (Inapam) recognized Don Chuchito nationally as the oldest person in Mexico.

== Death ==
He died on December 20, 2017, at the claimed age of 121 in the town of Nicolás Bravo, municipality of Othón P. Blanco in Quintana Roo the same town he had resided the last 27 years of his life.
