= Juan Álvarez =

Mexican general, caudillo and interim president (1790–1867)

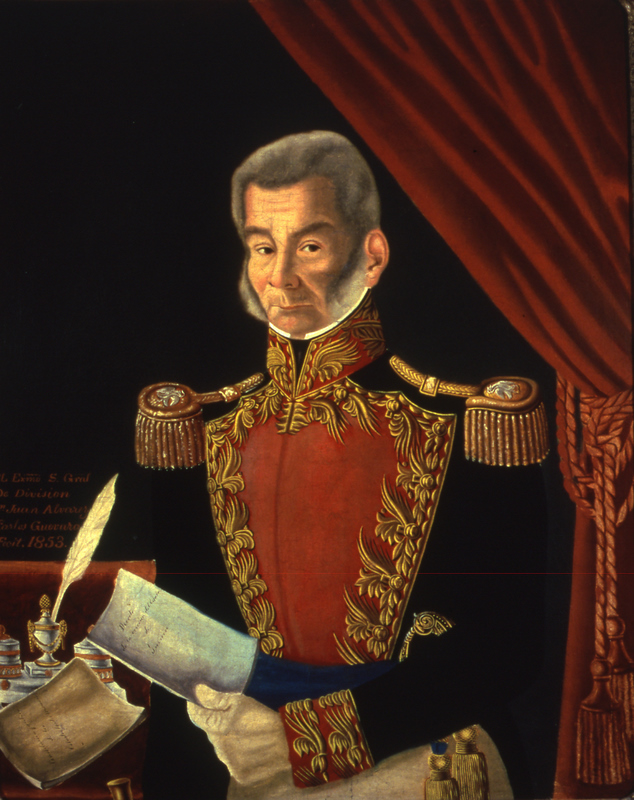
- Portrait made by an unknown artist, oil on canvas, Museo Nacional de Historia

24th President of Mexico
- In office 4 October 1855 – 11 December 1855
- Preceded by: Rómulo Díaz de la Vega
- Succeeded by: Ignacio Comonfort

Governor of Guerrero
- In office 15 January 1852 – 7 October 1853
- Preceded by: Miguel García
- Succeeded by: Tomás Moreno
- In office 15 January 1851 – 30 October 1851
- Preceded by: Miguel García
- Succeeded by: Miguel García
- In office 27 October 1849 – 31 January 1850
- Preceded by: Office established
- Succeeded by: Miguel García

Personal details
- Born: 27 January 1790 Atoyac, Kingdom of Mexico, Viceroyalty of New Spain (now Guerrero, Mexico)
- Died: 21 August 1867 (aged 77) Hacienda La Providencia, Guerrero, Mexico
- Resting place: Panteón de Dolores
- Party: Liberal
- Spouse: Faustina Benítez (m. 1810)
- Children: 2, including Diego Álvarez Benítez
- Occupation: Military officer; politician; hacendado
- Nickname(s): El Gallego; Tata Juan

Military service
- Allegiance: Mexican Insurgency; Three Guarantees; Mexico
- Branch/service: Mexican Army
- Years of service: 1810–1867
- Rank: Division general
- Commands: Acapulco and Fort of San Diego
- Battles/wars: Mexican War of Independence; Battle of El Veladero; Siege of Acapulco; Casa Mata Plan Revolution; War of the South; Battle of Venta Vieja; Battle of Texca; Battle of Chilpancingo; Plan of Veracruz; First Franco-Mexican War; Mexican–American War; Battle of Molino del Rey; Revolution of Ayutla; Reform War; Second Franco-Mexican War; Battles of Acapulco

Juan Nepomuceno Álvarez Hurtado (27 January 1790 – 21 August 1867), generally known as Juan Álvarez, was a Mexican general, federalist caudillo, a principal sponsor of the state of Guerrero and its first governor, and interim president of Mexico from 4 October to 11 December 1855. In a military career of more than fifty years he fought from the Mexican War of Independence through the war against the French-backed Second Mexican Empire and was the last veteran of independence to occupy the presidency.

During the independence era, he fought under José María Morelos and Vicente Guerrero on the Costa Grande and remained Guerrero’s principal lieutenant until his overthrow and execution. Guerrero's forces, made up of racially diverse peasants from the Costa Grande and Tierra Caliente passed to him and remained the core of his power. With that force he became the regional commander of the Revolution of Ayutla, which brought him to the presidency. His two-month government installed a cabinet that included a new generation of liberals and enacted the Ley Juárez, the opening act of the pivotal era of La Reforma. A racialized panic in the capital over his southern troops, together with a split in the Liberal camp, preceded his resignation in favor of Ignacio Comonfort.

== Early life and family ==
Álvarez was born on 27 January 1790 in Santa María de la Concepción de Atoyac (today Atoyac de Álvarez, Guerrero), in the barrio la Tachuela. His testament names his parents as Antonio Álvarez, “natural de España,” and Rafaela Hurtado, of the port of Acapulco. Nineteenth-century writers, including Ignacio Manuel Altamirano, identified the father as a Galician from Santiago de Compostela and recorded that Morelos nicknamed the young insurgent el Gallego.

As a child he studied in Mexico City under Ignacio Avilés. After his parents’ deaths he returned south around 1807; a tutor dissipated the inheritance and he worked as a vaquero. In his testament he wrote that whatever small property he and his wife had brought to the marriage “se acabó y desapareció con la guerra de nuestra independencia.” ("was lost, it disappeared with the War of Independence") He married Faustina Benítez in 1810. Their children included Diego Álvarez Benítez, later governor of Guerrero, and Encarnación Álvarez Benítez.

The family's ethnic background is not settled. Recent historiography, especially María Teresa Pavía Miller, argues that Acapulco had little Indigenous population, that Hurtado was a surname common among pardas, and that Álvarez was more plausibly Afro-descendant through his mother, while noting that no parish classification for her has been produced.

Opponents in his lifetime used African descent as an insult, calling Faustina Benítez a negra and marking Diego and Encarnación through their mother.

== War of Independence ==
=== Regular warfare under Morelos, 1810–1815 ===
Álvarez joined José María Morelos on 17 November 1810 as a soldier in the second battalion of the Regimiento de Guadalupe. The southern columns he entered were later called pintos calentanos: peasant militiamen of Tierra Caliente and the Costa Grande, many of them Indigenous or Afro-descendant, marked in the region by mal del pinto and drawn from the same villages that had filled the colonial coastal militias.

He was promoted to sergeant within a month and later to captain of cavalry after distinguishing himself at El Aguacatillo and La Sabana in early 1811. Sent to receive the surrender of the Fort of San Diego at Acapulco, he was drawn in and fired upon. Most of the company were killed. A bullet passed through both his legs; he would have died if the soldier Diego Eugenio Salas, himself wounded, had not carried him out. The wounds never fully healed and for the rest of his life he could not walk without crutches. He was wounded again at a second action in La Sabana and at the assault on Tixtla under Hermenegildo Galeana, after which he was made colonel. In 1813–14 he fortified Cerro del Veladero and was beaten by José Gabriel de Armijo at Pie de la Cuesta.

=== Guerrilla warfare with Vicente Guerrero, 1815–1821 ===
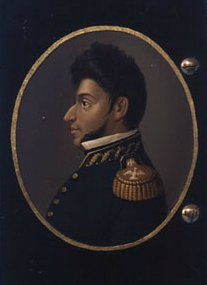
The liberal president Vicente Guerrero. Álvarez's commander in the south until 1831

After Morelos’s execution in 1815, the pintos of Tierra Caliente and the Costa Grande went over to Vicente Guerrero, the last major insurgent commander still in the field in the south. Álvarez placed himself under his command and remained one of the coastal captains inside Guerrero’s army, alongside Isidoro Montes de Oca, and others who held the coast between Acapulco and Zacatula. For the next six years the two men fought a guerrilla war against royalist forces.

In 1821 Guerrero and Álvarez defeated the royalists at El Paso Cueva del Diablo. Álvarez accepted the Plan of Iguala despite his republicanism; Guerrero recommended him to Agustín de Iturbide as the most prestigious chief on the Costa del Sur. He took Acapulco on 15 October 1821 with battalions of pintos and Indians and was held there as commander of the port and fortress.

== Lieutenant of Vicente Guerrero, 1821–1831 ==
He followed Guerrero when he rose against the First Mexican Empire in 1823 and again sided with him in the 1828 presidential crisis. After the state legislatures elected Manuel Gómez Pedraza, Álvarez and Montes de Oca occupied Acapulco and seconded Santa Anna’s Plan of Perote, which set the election aside and named Guerrero president. When irregulars began looting Spanish haciendas in Guerrero’s name around Cuernavaca, Álvarez took about 1,500 men there and restored order. Some biographies add that he opposed a general expulsion of Spaniards and protected persons and property on the coast; other papers from his circle use anti-peninsular language.

=== War of the South, 1830–1831 ===
When the Plan of Jalapa installed Anastasio Bustamante and expelled Guerrero from the presidency, Guerrero withdrew to the south and took up arms. Álvarez, the strongman of Acapulco, was distrusted by the new government, removed from the port command, and ordered away on a pretext. In March 1830 he and Guerrero adhered to the federalist plan associated with Juan José Codallos, calling for the restoration of the purged state legislatures and the Constitution of 1824.

Álvarez took the field as colonel of the División Protectora de la Soberanía de los Estados. Bustamante sent Nicolás Bravo against him. On 18 April 1830, from Venta Vieja, Álvarez wrote to Bravo that a fight between Mexicans would be a crime when they ought to be defending the country from foreigners. Bravo attacked before dawn on 24 April and reported Álvarez was driven toward El Veladero. The war continued as Álvarez fought on at El Veladero, El Manglar, Dos Arroyos, Las Cruces and Chilpancingo, After a setback near Chilpancingo, Guerrero made his headquarters in Acapulco. Álvarez stayed at Texca and supplied the coast, in part through the Genoese brig Colombo of Francisco Picaluga.

War minister José Antonio Facio then paid Picaluga to seize Guerrero and Álvarez together. On 14 January 1831 both men were invited to dine on the Colombo in Acapulco harbour. A disturbance at the fort called Álvarez back; Guerrero went aboard and was taken. Álvarez failed to free him. Guerrero was tried by court-martial and shot at Cuilapan, Oaxaca, on 14 February 1831. On 13 April 1831 Álvarez signed a convenio with Bravo that ended the War of the South.

== Caudillo of the south, 1831–1854 ==
Civic and regional historiography treat Álvarez after 1831 as the heir of Guerrero’s soldiers as well as of his political claim. On 12 August 1832 he seconded the Plan of Veracruz and rose againts Bustamante at the Fort of San Diego. In the manifesto to his division he called Guerrero the “victim of Cuilápam,” said that crime alone would justify the rebellion, and told the southerners they were not spectators of a revolution that had been born among them in 1830. He went on fighting centralism, including the 1833 defense against the Plan of Escalada. In 1838 he offered his forces to the government in the Pastry War. In 1841 he was promoted to general de división, during Antonio López de Santa Anna’s government after the Plan of Regeneración.

In the 1840s he mediated peasant land and tax revolts in Chilapa and the Tierra Caliente and recruited village fighters into federalist coalitions. Historian Peter Guardino has argued that this was his lasting importance: he tied peasant traditions of municipal office and village land defense to national federalism.

Opponents described that coalition in racial terms. Conservative writers accused him of threatening a guerra de castas. Santa Anna later wrote that Álvarez resembled “la pantera… por el odio constante contra nuestra raza.” ("The panther… because of the constant hatred against our race".) Supporters answered with the paternal Tata Juan.

=== Mexican–American War ===
Álvarez had warned that the colonization laws of 1824 would deliver Texas to the United States. In 1847 he brought the southern cavalry to the Valley of Mexico. According to a standard Mexican biographical notice, he fought mounted because the Independence wounds still forced him to use crutches on foot. At the Battle of Molino del Rey Santa Anna ordered him to strike the American flank with several thousand cavalry. The charge that Santa Anna wanted was not delivered as a decisive blow. After the war Santa Anna accused him of inaction and of watching from a mule. Mexican defenders reverse the blame onto Santa Anna’s orders and onto officers who balked at serving under him.

=== Creation of Guerrero ===
Álvarez was the principal regional sponsor of a new federal state carved from the south of Mexico, Puebla and Michoacán and named for Vicente Guerrero. The state was erected on 27 October 1849; Álvarez was named provisional commander that day and confirmed as first governor when the local legislature met at Iguala in January 1850. As governor he opposed the Plan del Hospicio, which aimed to unseat President Mariano Arista and recall Santa Anna. He told correspondents that nothing would be gained by bringing that man back, but did not take up arms against the plan. He wrote to Arista offering Guerrero as a refuge for the constitutional government; Arista declined and resigned on 5 January 1853. Santa Anna returned in April. Álvarez kept a quiet face until the dictatorship closed in on the south.

== Revolution of Ayutla ==
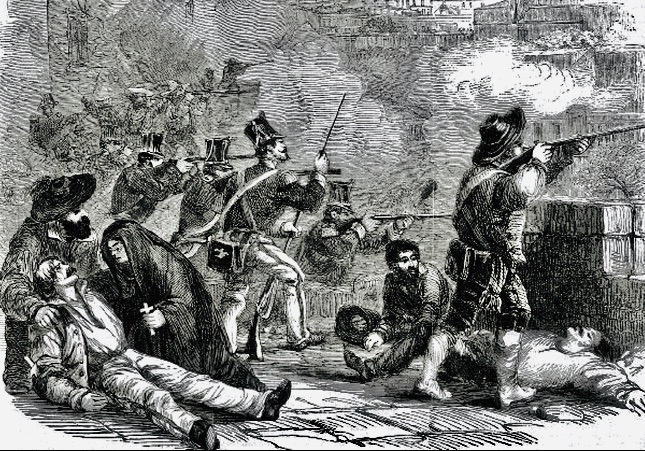
Fighting during the Revolution of Ayutla

On 20 February 1854 Álvarez pronounced against Santa Anna. On 1 March Colonel Florencio Villarreal proclaimed the Plan of Ayutla with about 400 pintos. A preamble set forth grievances against the dictatorship, and was followed by nine articles.

1. Santa Anna and his officers were stripped of authority in the name of the people.
2. After a majority of the nation had accepted the plan the revolutionary commander in chief was to convoke an assembly of representatives from each state and territory to choose an interim government.
3. The interim president was granted sufficient authority to carry out the tasks of government and protect national sovereignty.
4. The states who accepted the plan were to form new government while the indissolubility of the republic as a whole was emphasized.
5. The interim president was to convoke a congress.
6. Trade and military affairs were to be adequately administered.
7. Conscription and passport laws were to be abolished.
8. Opponents of the plan were to be treated as threats to national independence.
9. Placed either Nicolás Bravo, Tomás Moreno and Juan Álvarez the head of the movement.

The plan was ratified at Acapulco with a few amendments, including a provision allowing changes to be made in accordance with the national will, and Álvarez was chosen as head of the movement. Ignacio Comonfort seconded him.

Santa Anna took fierce measures against the insurgency including the confiscation of property belonging to the revolutionists, the burning of hostile towns, and the execution of revolutionary commanders taken in arms. Santa Anna personally led his troops against Acapulco but failed to take the city, burned neighboring haciendas, and withdrew after fighting around El Peregrino. He continued the struggle, but the revolution continued to spread and by August, 1855 Santa Anna abdicated. His successor at the capital, Martín Carrera attempted to be a compromise candidate and began carrying out clauses of the Plan, but Álvarez and the rest of the leaders did not trust him, viewing him as holdover from the Santa Anna regime, and an effort to dilute or coopt the revolution. After a month of failing to come to any agreement, Carrera resigned and the administrative responsibilities of government were handed over to the commander of the Mexico City garrison Rómulo Díaz de la Vega who supported the Plan of Ayutla, and awaited the arrival of Juan Álvarez.

Álvarez and his army reached Chilpancingo on 8 September 1855. Meanwhile, his lieutenant Ignacio Comonfort was at Lagos attempted to convince other, independent revolutionary leaders to recognize the leadership of Álvarez. This was achieved, and Álvarez continued his march towards Iguala intending to stay some time in Cuernavaca. At Iguala on 24 September 1855, in accordance with Article 2 of the Ayutla Plan, he issued a decree appointing one representative from each state and territory and summoned them to assemble at Cuernavaca on 4 October to elect an interim president. The representatives assembled accordingly with former president Valentín Gómez Farías as the assembly president, and future president of Mexico Benito Juárez as one of the secretaries. On the same day they elected Álvarez to the position of president.

== Presidency ==
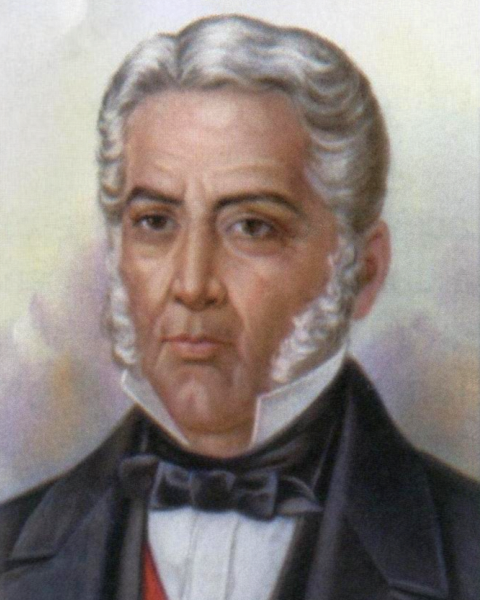
President Juan Álvarez

Álvarez governed first from Cuernavaca. His cabinet was the opening roster of La Reforma: Comonfort at War, Ocampo at Relations, Prieto at the Treasury, Juárez at Justice and Ecclesiastical Affairs, and Miguel Lerdo de Tejada at Development.

The first measure of the administration was the framing of an statue to serve as an interim constitution. Álvarez needed to strengthen the powers of the federal government and alleviate Mexico's chronic financial crisis. The president decreed that in the event of a vacancy in the executive office it ought to be filled by the council of state. On 15 October he also granted an amnesty to all military deserters, of which there had been many due to Santa Anna's conscription measures. On 16 October, a call was made for a congress to assemble at Dolores Hidalgo in February 1856, to organize the nation under the republican, democratic, and representative form, based upon a decree dating back to the Bases of Tacubaya in 1841. The congress would eventually meet on schedule though Álvarez would have stepped down from the presidency before then.

The government was divided from the start. Ocampo and Juárez favored dissolving and rebuilding the regular army; Comonfort wanted to reform it. Ocampo resigned on 7 December. Moderate Liberals and the capital’s notables distrusted both the puro program and the man who had brought it to the valley.

Meanwhile, there was a constitutional disorder throughout the republic. The new local governments which had been created by Article 4 of the Ayutla Plan were now assuming virtual complete sovereignty over their territories, and the federal government took strict measures against this trend, forbidding the military governors, the commandant generals from interfering in treasury matters or seizing the funds of custom houses. Álvarez, who had meanwhile been governing from Cuernavaca now moved himself and his troops to Mexico City.

=== The pintos in the capital ===
Casimiro Castro, Los pintos de Don Juan Álvarez en la Calle de San Juan de Letrán, (1855-1856)

Álvarez entered Mexico City on 15 November 1855 with a mixed column of regulars, civic militia and southern fighters. What the capital called “the pintos of Don Juan Álvarez.” Hostile writers treated them as a sudden caste invasion. It was the first time most of them had seen the force that had fought since 1810 for Morelos, then Guerrero, then Álvarez.

Niceto de Zamacois wrote of yellow, black, red, blue, white and green patches and a “color prieto” (dark-skin color) he ascribed to Indigenous and African mixture. Francisco de Paula de Arrangoiz later remembered soldiers of “asqueroso aspecto,” ("disgusting appearance"), some looking “más figura que de seres racionales, de monos.” ("more like animals than rational beings, like monkeys.") El Universal called Álvarez the pantera and antropófago of the south. The French minister spoke of cleansing barracks to avoid “la lepra del sur.” ("leprosy from the south.") Moderate Liberals used the same language as Conservatives when it served to detach the presidency from the puros. The rumors that Álvarez would be replaced by Comonfort grew not only from cabinet fights over the army, but in the racialized climate as well.

=== Inauguration of La Reforma ===
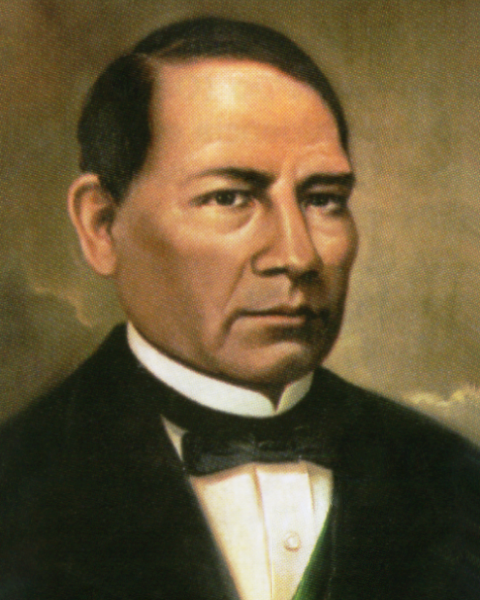
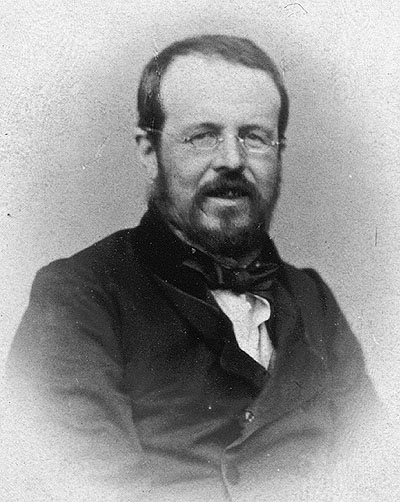
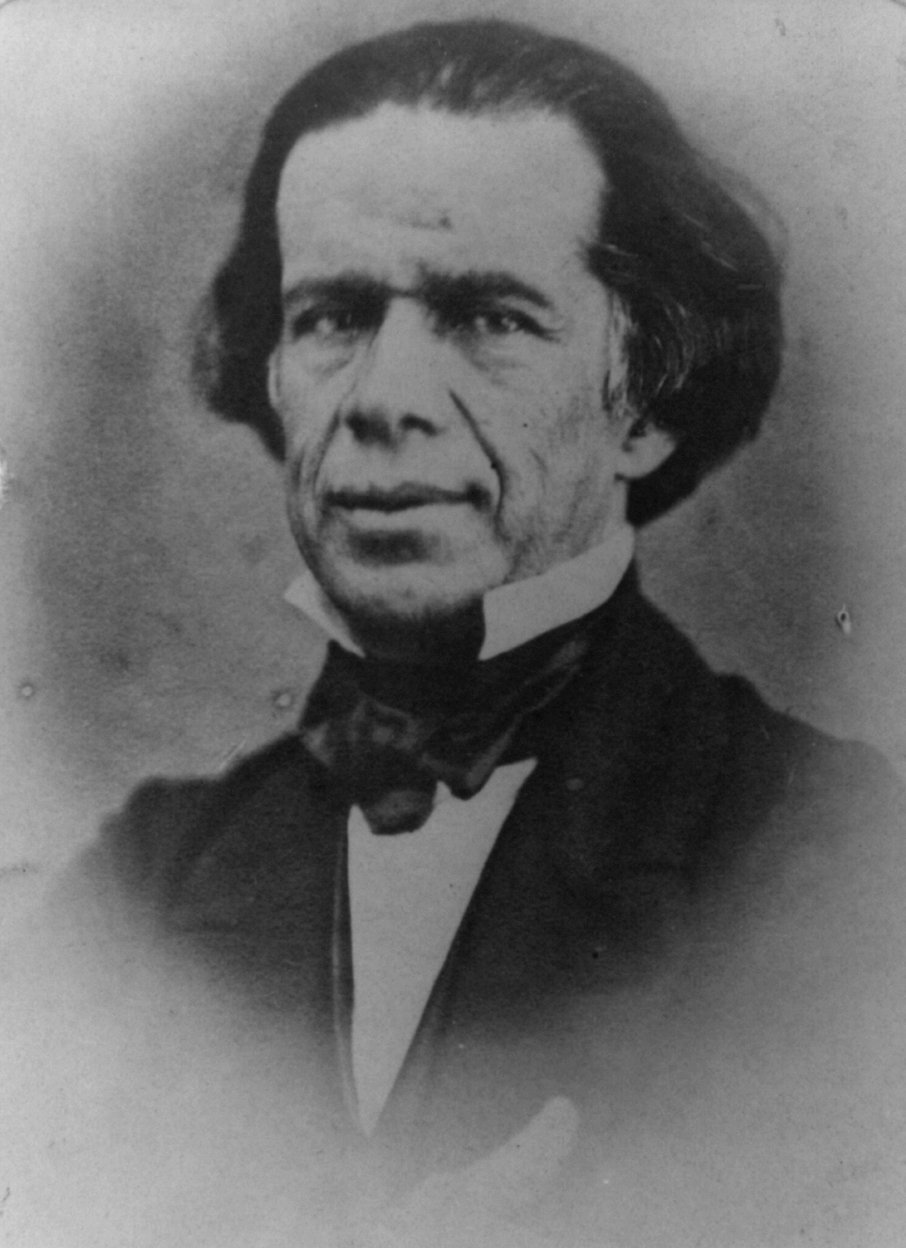
Alvarez's cabinet contained a new generation of liberals raised after the Mexican War of Independence, including Benito Juárez, Guillermo Prieto, and Melchor Ocampo (left to right).

Álvarez's cabinet which had included the progressive state governors Benito Juárez and Melchor Ocampo, and the poet Guillermo Prieto represented a new generation of liberals that had grown up since independence, and intended to pass unprecedented reforms during a period which began with the Álvarez administration and would eventually come to be known as La Reforma. The reforms would culminate in the Constitution of 1857, and open conflict with the opponents of the measures which would not entirely end until 1867.

They began with the Ley Juárez, which stripped the Mexican clergy of their independent legal privileges (fueros) which they had hereunto enjoyed under canon and civil law. The Ley Juárez was prefaced by the cause celebre of Father Javier Miranda. On 20 November 1855, the former conservative minister, Father Miranda was arrested in his home at Puebla. He was then transported to Mexico City where he was held at the barracks of San Hipolito. This was technically illegal as the government could not at the time imprison a priest without collaboration from church authorities. The conservative press was outraged, and even the liberal press criticized the arrest as arbitrary and advocated for Miranda to be tried and for the government to explain its motives in arresting him. The bishop of Puebla protested to the government, but to no avail. The only response of the government was to transport Miranda to the fortress of San Juan de Ulúa in Veracruz Harbor. It was suspected that the arrest was due to Miranda's political views.

The Ley Juárez was passed on 22 November 1855. Ecclesiastical tribunals were stripped of their ability to judge civil law cases. They were allowed to continue judging clergy in the cases of canon law. With Father Miranda's case in mind, conservatives accused this measure as a means of passing severe anti-clerical laws, arresting priests on the slightest pretext, and then judging them in civil courts. Opponents of the measure accused government deputies of hypocrisy for claiming to support equality before the law while maintaining their own immunity.

The Archbishop protested against the measure and suggested that the question of the ecclesiastical fuero should be submitted to the pope, a suggestion which was rejected by the government. The conservative generals Santa Anna and Blanco were officially stripped of their charges and the liberals Degollado and Moreno were commissioned as generals. Comonfort was now threatening to resign and only keep the office of general in chief. Álvarez directed his secretaries to lay before him proposals on how to proceed, he also directed his council to prepare a draft of the statute. Meanwhile, the conservatives began to favor the moderate Comonfort for the presidency.

=== Resignation ===
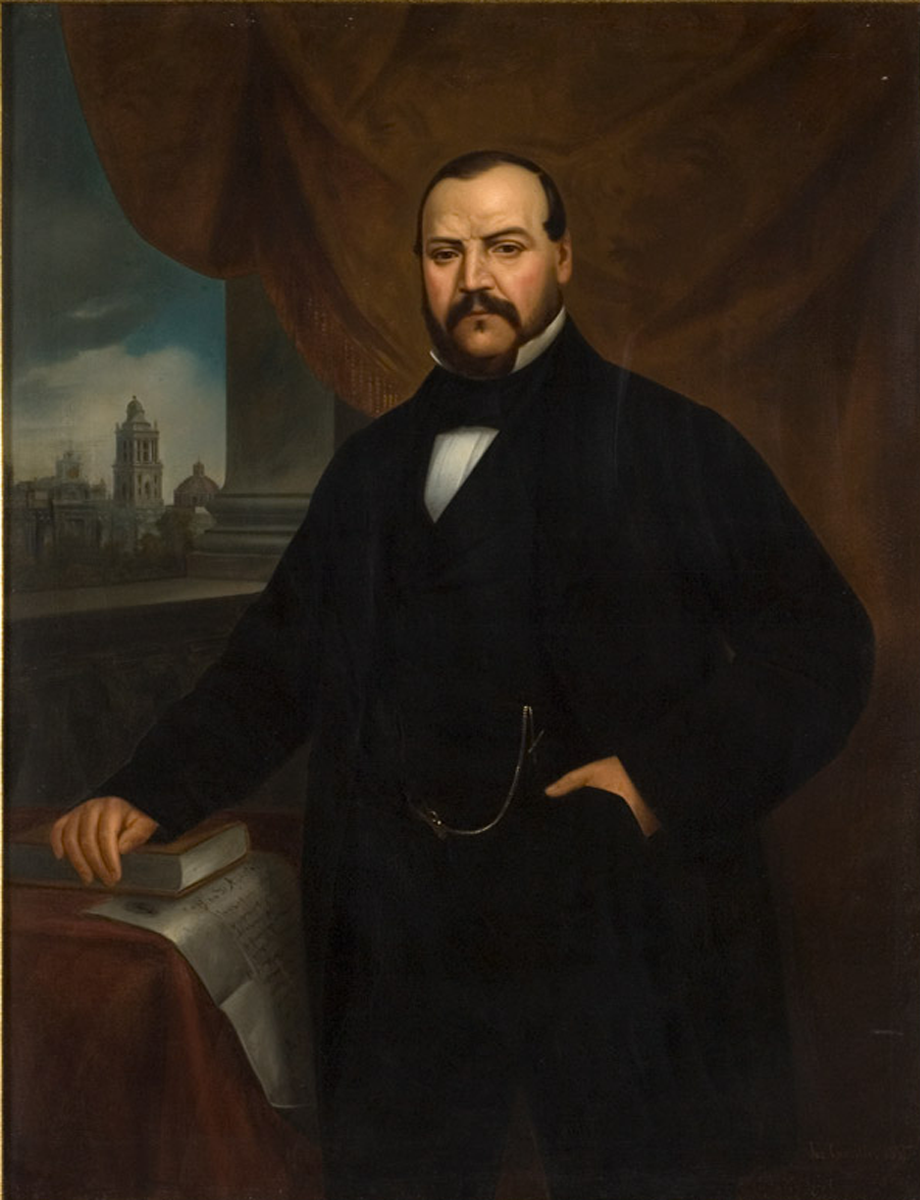
Alvarez resigned in favor of Ignacio Comonfort, hoping the more moderate statesmen could better implement liberal reforms.

Álvarez seriously considered stepping down from the presidency and handing it over to Comonfort, but the latter's enemies urged Álvarez to stay in office. On 4 December, Álvarez summoned a meeting of the most prominent members of the liberal party for advice on how to proceed. He wavered on the matter and on the following day accepted the resignation of his entire ministry and summoned Luis de la Rosa in organizing another. The portfolios would remain empty for the rest of Álvarez' presidency.

On 6 December Manuel Doblado pronounced in Guanajuato for Comonfort and accused Álvarez of attacking religion. Álvarez had already decided to go. Age and health were among the reasons he gave: climate, the season and the work of government had worsened his illnesses and he needed a milder country to recover. Leaving the capital he wrote:

I entered the Presidency poor, and I leave it poor, but with the satisfaction that I am not burdened by public censure, because, having devoted myself to manual labor from a very young age, I know how to handle the plow to support my family, without needing the public offices where others enrich themselves at the expense of orphans and the destitute.

He left Mexico City on 18 December with a lancer escort. Capital papers marked the departure of the pintos with relief.

== Later life ==
Back in Guerrero, Álvarez put down revolts against Comonfort's administration and then held the south for the Liberals in the Reform War as commander of the División del Sur. During the Second French intervention which began in 1861, he advised President Juárez to continue the war if the center fell, and Juárez gave orders to his forces to obey Álvarez in case they lost contact with the central government. He once again commanded the División del Sur and, with his son Diego, the defense of Acapulco during the French bombardments of 10–12 January 1863. He lived to see the French withdrawal in 1866 and the fall of Emperor Maximilian in June 1867.

== Legacy ==
Atoyac de Álvarez and Chilapa de Álvarez in Guerrero take his name, as does Acapulco’s General Juan N. Álvarez International Airport and the General Juan N. Álvarez National Park near Chilapa, decreed in 1964. In 1861, on the motion of Ignacio Manuel Altamirano, Congress declared him Benemérito de la Patria; a decree of 8 February 1868 ordered the name inscribed in gold letters in the Chamber of Deputies. His remains were transferred from La Providencia to the Rotonda de las Personas Ilustres on 27 December 1922. Official civic history treats him as the regional author of Ayutla and a precursor of the Reform laws.

In Guerrero, where he is best remembered, official commemorations now call him Afro-Mexican. A 2026 parliamentary proposal in the state congress styled Arenal de Álvarez the birthplace of “un ilustre afromexicano” and a floor speech the same month called him “orgullosamente afromexicano.” Scholars and public history already pair him with Guerrero as southern presidents who were raced; the federal civic calendar, however, reserves the title “presidente afromexicano” for Guerrero alone.

== Sobriquets ==
- "El Gallego" – The Galician
- "Tata Juan" – Father Juan
- "La Pantera del Sur" – The Panther (Racialized/pejorative)
- "Antropófago del Sur" – Anthropophage of the South (pejorative)

== See also ==
- List of heads of state of Mexico
- Nicolás Bravo
- Liberalism in Mexico
- Afro-Mexicans

Political offices
Preceded by Rómulo Díaz de la Vega	President of Mexico; 4 October - 11 December 1855	Succeeded by Ignacio Comonfort
