= Pact of Torreon =

1914 call to revise the Mexican Constitution of 1857

In the history of Mexico, the Pact of Torreón was a plan drawn up during the Mexican Revolution in early July 1914 by generals of the Constitutionalist Army in the important northern city of Torreón, Coahuila. The pact was framed as a modification of Venustiano Carranza’s 1913 Plan of Guadalupe, which was a narrow political plan. The pact called for a constitutional convention to revise the 1857 Mexican Constitution. It excluded commanders in the Constitutionalist Army from running for the presidency of the republic in the future. It called for the end of the Federal Army, at the time commanded by former general, now president of Mexico, Victoriano Huerta. The Pact of Torreón added to Plan of Guadalupe language that was more radical than Carranza’s, prompting Carranza to issue "Additions to the Plan of Guadalupe".

== Background ==
Governor of Coahuila, Venustiano Carranza had supported Francisco I. Madero, who was elected President of Mexico in 1911 after the ouster of long-time President, Porfirio Díaz, in 1910-11. In February 1913 a right-wing coup forced Madero and his vice president to resign and they were murdered shortly thereafter. General Victoriano Huerta of the Federal Army assumed power as President of Mexico. In March 1913, Carranza issued his Plan of the Hacienda of Guadalupe (later simply called the Plan of Guadalupe). In it he denounced Huerta as a usurper and his government illegitimate, calling for his ouster. Carranza designated himself as the First Chief (Primer Jefe) of the Constitutionalist Army, urging on others opposing Huerta to join the fight. A civilian himself, Carranza attracted first-rate leaders of men, particularly Pancho Villa and Alvaro Obregón. From March 1913 through June 1914 the northern coalition grew in size and power, poised to defeat the Federal Army. Villa, commander of the Constitutionalist Army’s Division of the North, was increasingly at odds with Carranza, who saw Villa as his rival and sought to sideline him. The Pact of Torreón was a short-term compromise between the generals of the Constitutionalist Army and Carranza, laying out the terms of the transition following the expected Constitutionalist victory. The commander of the Division of the Northeast, Pablo González Garza, suggested to Pancho Villa that the generals meet and forge an agreement so that they could remain united as revolutionaries at this key juncture.

Villa agreed to meet and emissaries, four from the Division of the North and four from the Division of the Northeast, met in Torreón, Coahuila in July 1914. "The agreement amounted to a kind of armistice between the two factions" of Villa and Carranza, but neither felt bound by it. Villa later described the pact as a way to convince foreign governments, meaning the U.S., that the northern revolutionaries were united.

== The Pact ==
In the short term, Villa reaffirmed Carranza as the First Chief of the Constitutionalist Army. Carranza had tried to slow Villa’s string of victories by cutting off coal supplies, necessary to fuel railway transport of his troops, as well as ammunition. The pact called on Carranza to resume coal deliveries and ammunition supplies, which did not occur.

More important were the pact’s articulation of long-term goals after the Federal Army’s defeat. Article 7 of the pact calls for the surrender of the Federal Army and its complete dissolution and punishment of the Roman Catholic Church for its support of the Huerta government.

The Divisions of the North and the Northeast, understanding that the present [conflict] is the struggle of the disinherited against the powerful, pledge themselves to fight until the ex-Federal Army completely disappears and the Constitutionalist Army shall take its place; to promote the democratic regime in our country; to punish and subdue the Roman Catholic clergy which ostensibly allied itself with Huerta, and to emancipate economically the proletariat by making equitable distribution of lands and by promoting the well-being of the workers.

Article 8 goes further with its sharp ideological language, in contrast to Carranza’s Plan of Guadalupe.

8th. The present conflict being a struggle of the disinherited against the abuses of the powerful, and understanding the causes of the misfortunes which afflict the country emanate from a praetorianism, from a plutocracy and from the clergy, the Divisions of the North and Northeast solemnly pledge themselves to fight until the ex-Federal Army shall disappear completely; to implant in our nation a democratic regime; to promote the well-being of the workers; to emancipate economically the rural workers by making an equitable distribution of lands, or by other means toward the resolution of the agrarian problem, and to admonish, punish, and to demand the proper responsibilities of the members of the Roman Catholic clergy, who both materially and intellectually have aided the usurper, Victoriano Huerta.

== Impact ==
Carranza’s 1913 Plan of Guadalupe was invoked in the Pact of Torreón, and was framed as updating that plan in light of the current situation in 1914. Carranza was pushed to draft his "Additions to the Plan of Guadalupe" in December 1914 as it became clear that he had to counter and undermine the more radical rhetoric of Villa and those supporting him.
