= Plan Orozquista =

1912 call to revolt against Mexican president Francisco Madeira by Pascual Orozco

In the history of Mexico, the Plan Orozquista was a plan issued by revolutionary general Pascual Orozco on 25 March 1912. It is sometimes called the Plan of the Empacadora, since it was signed in a cotton factory. In it, Orozco repudiated the government of President Francisco I. Madero, which he charged had betrayed the Mexican Revolution.

== Background ==
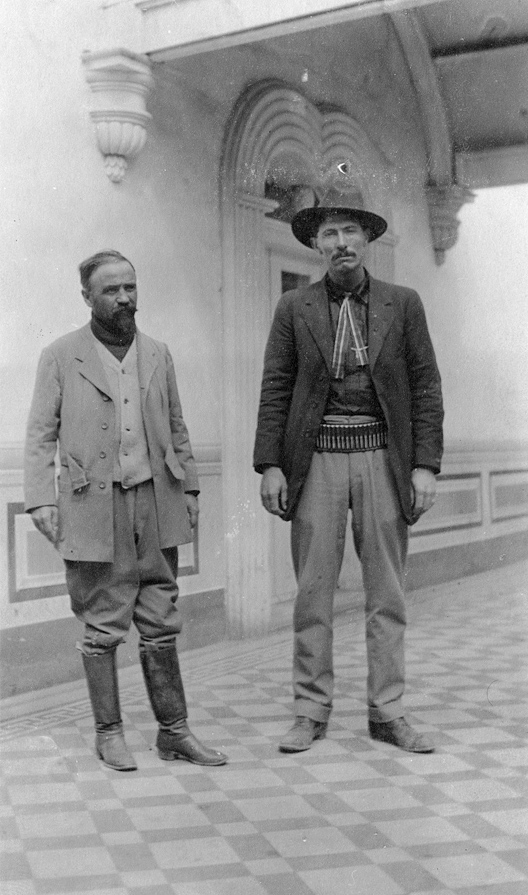
Pascual Orozco and Francisco I. Madero

Orozco along with Pancho Villa had defeated the Federal Army in the Battle of Ciudad Juárez, which pushed Porfirio Díaz to resign as president and go into exile. Madero signed the Treaty of Ciudad Juárez, which called for an interim government, new elections, and the retention of the Federal Army, which Orozco’s forces had just defeated. Revolutionary forces were demobilized. Once Madero was elected President in October 1911, he did not move on land reform, which had been one of the promises in his 1910 Plan of San Luis Potosí. Emiliano Zapata rebelled against Madero in November 1911, issuing the Plan of Ayala. By March 1912, Orozco himself rebelled against Madero. His plan brought together armed forces in Chihuahua, which posed a significant challenge to Madero. Madero initially sent General José González Salas to put down the rebellion. When he failed after a military disaster, González Salas committed suicide. Orozco issued his plan on the same day as the general's suicide. Madero then sent General Victoriano Huerta to suppress the rebellion. The plan is lengthy compared to Madero's Plan de San Luis Potosí, with over 35 separate articles. The plan was prefaced by a bitter denunciation of Madero, who had dismissed Orozco's contribution to the Revolution and sidelined him once he was elected president. Orozco's biographer Michael C. Meyer sees the Plan as "highly significant" for addressing socio-economic issues. The is published in English translation.

== Plan ==
Article 1 is brief, stating "The initiator of the Revolution, Francisco I. Madero, falsified and violated the Plan of San Luis Potosi." Articles 2, 3, 4, 7, and 8 denounce Madero and his family for malfeasance and an alleged alliance between the US, Wall Street bankers, which "placed the destiny of the Fatherland [patria] in the hands of the American government…." Historian Alan Knight considers the anti-Americanism in the Plan as "the stock-in-trade not only of Mexican polemicists (of different hues), but also of a good many Americans too," continuing "Orozquistas [did not] display strong or consistent hostility to American interests."

Article 9 sums up Orozco's position regarding Madero. "Because of the above-mentioned indiscretions and crimes, Francisco I. Madero and his accomplices are declared traitors to the Fatherland and outside the law." Article 10 challenges the election of 1911, which he calls fraudulent. Article 10 says "the election for the presidency and vice presidency are considered null and void. As a consequence, Francisco I. Madero is not recognized as president nor José María Pino Suárez as vice president."

Article 12 repudiates any concessions and contracts of Madero, his family, and his allies and calls for their confiscation.

Articles 13 and 14 promise that existing civil authorities will remain in place, so long as they support the Revolution and withdraw support from Madero.

A series of articles deal with the structure of the political system. Article 16 repudiates personalism and explicitly does not name a provisional or interim president, rather than Orozco as author of the plan naming himself in that role. Article 16 calls for the abolition of the office of vice president. Article 17 lays out the transition following the Orozquistas' presumed victory.

Article 32 calls for the complete nationalization of the railways. This was in process under the Díaz regime.

Article 33 calls for the replacement of personnel for Mexicans in private companies and equal pay for Mexicans and foreigners. This is reminiscent of the Liberal Party Program of 1906.

Article 34 seeks to "improve and raise the conditions of the working class", outlining in five sub-articles the abolition of company stores [tiendas de raya]; wages to be paid in cash not company scrip; limitation on number of hours worked; prohibition of labor for children under age 10 and limitation of hours to those age 10-16; increase in daily wages; demands for hygienic conditions in factories that "guarantee the health of the workers."

Article 35 deals with the agrarian problem, which "demands the most careful and violent solution," laying out seven principles for achieving that. 1. Recognition of property rights of those occupying land peacefully for 20 years; 2. Revalidation and improvement of land titles; 3. "Lands seized by despoilment will be returned"; 4. "Uncultivated and nationalized land throughout the Republic will be redistributed." 5. Expropriation of land from large landowners who do not keep land under cultivation, "The land thus expropriated will be partitioned to improve intensive agriculture." 6. The government will float an agricultural bond to pay for expropriated lands; 7. The establishment of a regulatory law for land reform.

The Plan ends with rhetorical flourishes urging Mexicans to join the defense of institutions and "withdraw recognition of the government of an ominous man [Madero] who is carrying the country to ruin and slavery. Your heroism and discipline in the last contest won you the admiration of the world: If the chivalrous spirit in your souls evokes scruples about having to shoot fellow Mexicans, we ask that you bear in mind that this is a true fight of emancipation.

== Impact ==
In Chihuahua Orozco was already a hero for his role in the Mexican Revolution. His repudiation of Madero's government in early March 1912 attracted men willing to follow his lead. The articulation of the plan laid out what he was fighting for, giving followers an understanding of what they were fighting for. Orozco's issuing of a formal plan gave Orozco and his movement put Madero's government on notice about Orozco's specific personal and political grievances against Madero. Orozco had hoped other northern states would rally to his plan, but only Chihuahua did, but some 5,000 men answered his call to arms and posed a huge challenge to the new and weak Madero government. Orozco's rebellion was ultimately suppressed by General Victoriano Huerta and the Federal Army, but Madero's government and hold on power was undermined by this challenge from a revolutionary hero.

== See also ==
- Mexican Revolution
- Plans in Mexican history
