= Plan of San Luis Potosí =

1910 Mexican political document by revolutionary leader Francisco I. Madero

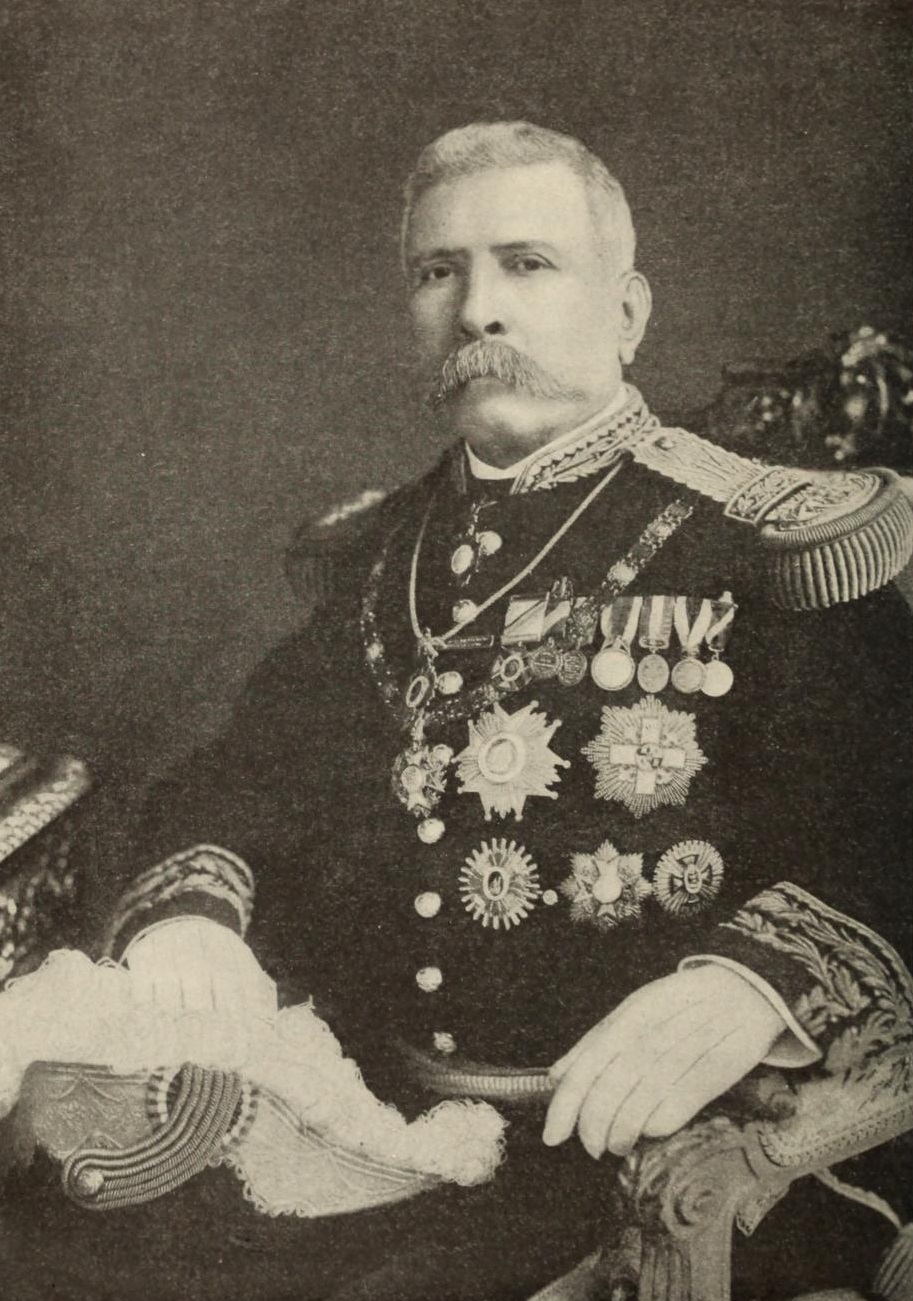
Porfirio Díaz, president at the start of the Revolution

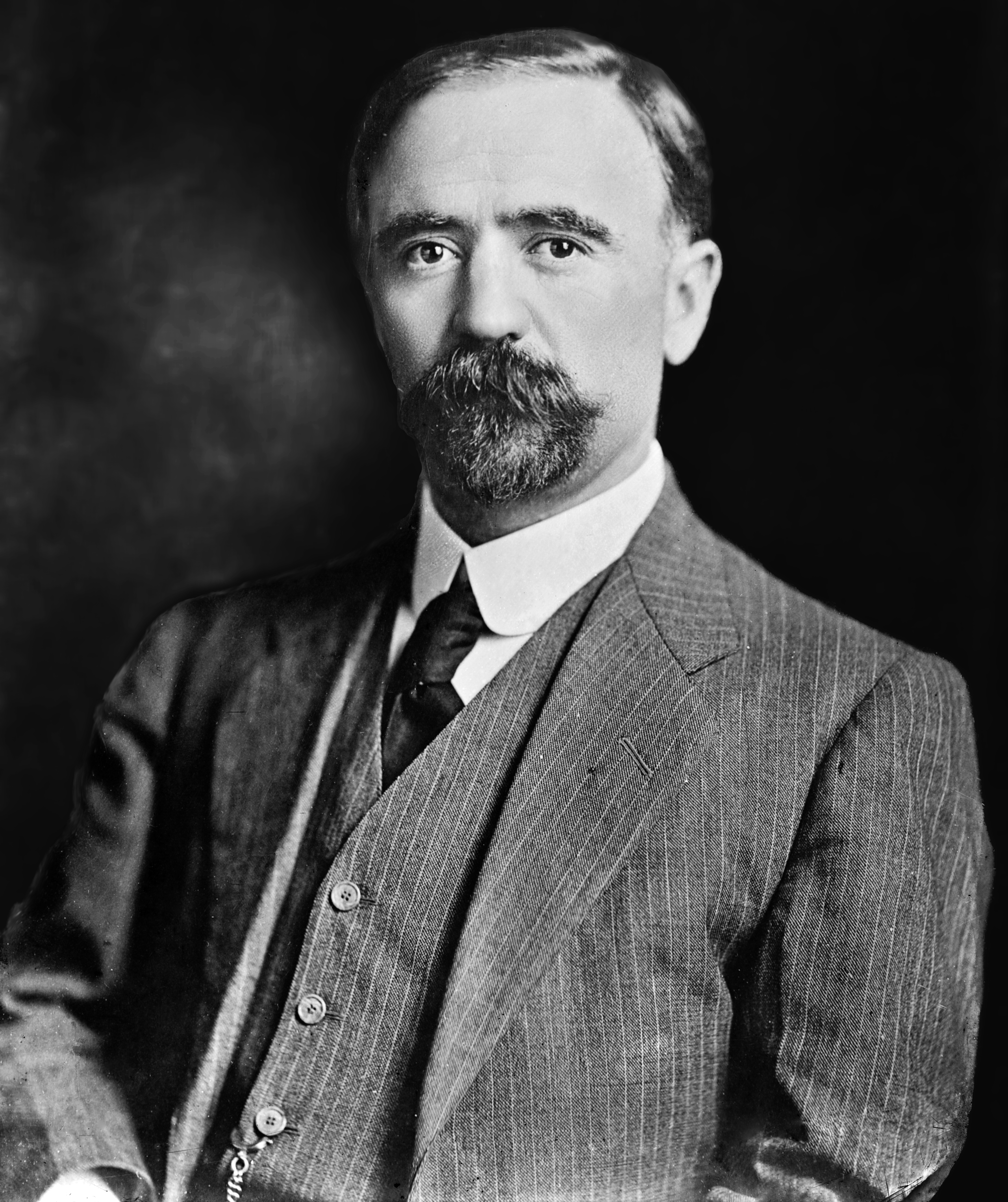
Francisco I. Madero, President of Mexico (1911–1913)

The Plan of San Luis Potosí (Spanish: Plan de San Luis) is a key political document of the Mexican Revolution, written by presidential candidate Francisco I. Madero following his escape from jail. He had challenged President Porfirio Díaz in the 1910 presidential elections, when Díaz was 80 years old, and garnered a broad-based following. Díaz jailed him when it became clear Madero might win. Madero escaped and drafted the plan to explain why armed rebellion against Díaz was now the only way to remove him from office. It was published on 5 October 1910. It called for nullifying the fraudulent 1910 election of Porfirio Díaz, proclaimed Madero as provisional president, and called on the Mexican people to revolt on 20 November 1910.

== Background events ==
Liberal general and politician Porfirio Díaz had come to the presidency of Mexico in 1876 by means of coup against Sebastián Lerdo de Tejada. With a short interregnum in 1880–84, Díaz returned to power and remained there continuously until 1911. He gave an interview to a journalist working for a U.S. publication, James Creelman, saying that he would not run for another term in the 1910 presidential elections. This set off a flurry of political activity, including the entry into politics of a wealthy landowner from the state of Coahuila, Francisco I. Madero. Madero penned a work titled The Presidential Succession of 1910 and gathered support in Mexico for his candidacy, creating the Anti-Re-electionist Party. Díaz changed his mind about retiring from politics and ran for re-election. To assure his victory, Díaz had Madero jailed. Madero escaped and fled north, crossing the U.S. border at Laredo, Texas, on 7 October 1910. The plan was drafted and reviewed in San Antonio, Texas, but "it was dated, for reasons of convenience, dignity, and neutrality, as in San Luis Potosí, the fifth of October, the last day Madero was in the city". He asked several Anti-Re-electionists, including Federico González Garza, Roque Estrada, Juan Sánchez Azcona, and Enrique Bordes Mangel, to review his rough draft, but it remained his work. It was "formulated to serve as the ideological banner of the revolution." The plan was published in November 1910 and secretly distributed. It called for the revolt to begin at 6 p.m. on 20 November 1910.

== Text ==
This document contained many reasons why Díaz should not be in power anymore: scandalous elections, stripping away of land, degrading citizens, and the causing of bankruptcy. The document, or 'plan', called for the destruction of Díaz's authoritarian presidency and the re-institution of democracy through violent direct action on the part of the populace. The results of this document were the start of the Mexican Revolution and the collapse of the presidency of Porfirio Díaz.

The Plan declared the 1910 election illegal, and declared Madero provisional president pending new elections. It called for the people to rise up in arms on Sunday, 20 November 1910, at 6:00 pm and revolt against Díaz and overthrow his government. Few initially heeded the call.

== Subsequent impact ==
A series of revolts – particularly in Mexico's north and in the state of Morelos, close to Mexico City – put pressure on the Díaz government. Díaz resigned in May 1911 and went into exile in Paris. An interim government was installed and new elections held, with Madero winning. He held office until February 1913, when disorder in Mexico City, known as the Ten Tragic Days (la decena trágica) provided the opportunity for a military coup by the head of the federal army, Victoriano Huerta. Madero and his vice president, José María Pino Suárez, resigned under pressure and were then murdered. Forces counter to the Huerta government rose up, with Venustiano Carranza, a politician and wealthy land owner, becoming the leader of the northern forces. He issued the Plan of Guadalupe.

November 20, the date of Madero's plan, is celebrated as Revolution Day in Mexico.

== See also ==
- Day of the Revolution
- Mexico
- Mexican Revolution
- Plans in Mexican history
- History of democracy in Mexico
