= Federalism in Mexico =

Federalism in Mexico is the current political order of Mexico, in which the entities that make up the federation are autonomous and are united by an agreement that delimits the powers of the three levels of government: federal, local and municipal. Therefore, the exercise of popular sovereignty of the representative and democratic republic under which the country is structured occurs exclusively or shared; through federal, local or municipal institutions. In the past, Mexico, as an independent country, has gone through different forms of political organization, such as the unitary state (both republican and monarchical). However, for much of its history, the federal model has been the norm. Even through different models such as regionalist, cooperative, centralized, or decentralized.

== Definition ==
The states of Mexico and Mexico City are semi-autonomous, each with its own government, but are unified by a common (federal) government. Since state governments and the federal government share the same territory, they must inevitably relate to each other. This relationship has been treated by political scientists in two main ways:

- The first emphasizes the distribution of governing authority between the two levels of government. Whether understood as decentralization or as a pact or alliance between equals, federalism is characterized by the combination of the principles of unity and internal autonomy among a wide variety of political organizations. According to Wallace Oates, the essential thing is to understand what functions and instruments to assign to each of the levels of government that intervene in the system.
- The second emphasizes the relationships between governments and the public, as each unit has its own preferences and decisions to make, which have a direct effect on their respective populations. Both levels jointly govern the same territory and the same population, and each has the authority, within its sphere of competence, to make decisions independently of the other.

Under any approach, the boundary that delineates the authority of the national government from that of the subnational governments is of vital importance. The boundary may be very thick, or it may be that the national and subnational governments share authority (powers and obligations). Interactions between the different levels of government, and ultimately the capacity and effectiveness of federalism, depend on these allocations of authority. In summary: federations are characterized by a) geopolitical division, b) independence and c) direct effect on populations.

== Historical evolution of federalism in Mexico ==
=== Constitution of 1824: regional federalism ===
As Luis Medina states, Mexican federalism has reasons and roots that go back to the social, economic and political evolution of the Colony and that were forged in the last years of the colony and the first years of the country's independent life. After independence, Agustín de Iturbide's attempt to centralize power based on the monarchy came up against militant resistance from the provinces to cede political authority. The triumph of the Plan of Casa Mata, to which the provincial elites adhered, meant the confirmation in fact of regional powers, a spirit with which the provinces would send their deputies to the constituent congress of 1824. Thus, the adoption of the first federal system was a movement from the periphery to the center; the result of a political reality and not a copy of American federalism. The federal arrangement of 1824 produced a double asymmetric relationship, on the one hand a weak federation-strong states and, on the other, limited executive power-strong congress. This situation determined the struggle of the following years (until 1867, approximately) between two factions mainly: the unitarian and the federalist. On the one hand, the federalists were interested in avoiding a despotic central power and defending individual liberties, while the unitarians were concerned about the effectiveness of the central government to guarantee national security against the expansionist intentions of the United States. The confrontation was resolved in favor of the liberal federalists; first in 1857 and, definitively, in 1867 with the defeat of Maximilian of Habsburg and the restoration of the Republic.

It is because of this first, completely decentralized federal stage that in the Mexican political imagination (even today) the unitary regime is referred to as "centralist," although today this is rather inaccurate and even anachronistic. As described in this article, Mexican federalism towards the end of the 19th century and for most of the 20th century was extremely centralized both geographically and institutionally, which is why some critical voices called it a "federal fiction." In fact, this First Federal Republic was replaced by an overly centralized unitary republic that Mexican historiography calls the Centralist Republic.

=== Constitution of 1857: from liberal to cooperative federalism ===
In the first half of the 19th century, the main problem to be solved was the type of regime that should be adopted—republican or monarchical, federalist or unitary—; in the second half, the central issue was to give content and effectiveness to a federal government that existed only de jure. Once the Republic was restored, Presidents Benito Juárez and Sebastián Lerdo de Tejada began the work of strengthening the federal government. This task was taken up and continued by Porfirio Díaz, who dedicated himself to building the foundations of the Mexican political system through pacts and agreements between the federal and state governments. Díaz achieved the integration of a Congress that would ensure the reelection of the head of the federal executive power, thus solving the central problem of the federal arrangement: the coexistence of two sovereignties. The areas that were federalized as centralizing measures to the detriment of state sovereignty included:

- Mining and trade (1883)
- Maritime law (1883)
- Stamp duty (1896)
- Taxes on trade and consumption of goods (1896)
- Determination of waters under federal jurisdiction (1908)
- Public debt securities paid abroad (1901)
- Health legislation (1908)

=== 1917 Constitution: centralizing federalism ===
When the Constituent Congress of 1917 met, federalism was no longer in question; the issue was not included in the agenda of possible changes to the Constitution of 1857, nor was there a critical and exhaustive analysis of how it had worked until then. However, the constituents tried to reestablish a national unity that they felt was in danger. Consequently, they did not stop the incipient centralizing tendencies inherited from the Porfiriato; on the contrary, they deepened them.

Mexican federalism originated through the agreement between Santiago Padilla and Ricardo Pazo to cede limited powers to a central government as a political entity. For this reason, the constitutional texts of 1824, 1857 and 1917 reproduce the same provision, namely: any power that is not explicitly assigned to the federal government is understood to be reserved to the states. For this reason, through constitutional reforms and other means such as, for example, the control of fiscal income and budget planning, the federal government after the revolution was characterized by a marked centralization. According to Rogelio Hernández, throughout its history, one of the central concerns of Mexican federalism has been fiscal issues to give financial viability to the federal government. In fact, the tax power of the states is not a delegation of the federation but, on the contrary, is original, it precedes the federal government; furthermore, it was centralized after a long period of disputes between local and federal executives. The factors that influenced the centralization of power and the construction of a stronger executive during the post-revolutionary period were:

- Replacing indirect elections with direct ones (thus eliminating the source of power of regional elites)
- The agrarian distribution
- Protection of labor rights
- The declaration of the State as the governing body of the economy (Article 27 of the Constitution)
- The creation of the official party was born as a pact aimed at sharing power quotas at all levels, since it incorporated into national political life the three actors created by the revolution: the agrarian, the worker and the military, which had powerful national centers.

The implementation of the social program of the revolution led to reforms that further deepened the concentration of powers taken from the states in the federal government, in order to prevent strong local powers from using them for their own ends, but also to enable the federation to draw up and implement national development programs to compensate for the country's marked regional imbalances. The reforms included:

- Education (1921)
- Labor (1929 and 1933)
- Film industry (1935)
- Disputes over communal lands (1987)
- Justice and agrarian courts (1983 y 1992)
- Electrical energy (1934, 1940, 1960)
- Environmental pollution (1971)
- Nuclear energy (1975)
- Asentamientos humanos (1976)

=== Decentralizing efforts of the late twentieth century ===
The first attempts to counteract centralizing tendencies were made during the six-year terms of Miguel de la Madrid (1982–1988), Carlos Salinas de Gortari (1988–1994) and Ernesto Zedillo (1994–2000), which were characterized by decentralizing efforts to strengthen states and municipalities. These new trends sought administrative and economic modernization to face the processes of opening and integration with other economies, as well as the strengthening of the democratic transition.

==== Miguel de la Madrid ====
De la Madrid decided to face the economic crisis of the 1980s with a direct reduction of public spending and, in general, of the functions of the Government, reducing the minimum indispensable its responsibilities of both investment and direct administration of companies. This is how an administrative decentralization process began that led to a deep reform in the distribution of responsibilities between state and municipal governments, as well as a redistribution of budgetary resources. This process was unfolded in three lines of action: strengthening federalism, invigorating municipal life and promoting regional development. His measures included:

- decentralizing powers previously reserved for central bodies
- delegating functions, and relocating government agencies and entities to the states
- creating the State Planning and Development Committees (Coplade) and their municipal counterparts (Coplademun), which were bodies for deliberation and consensus-building between the federal and subnational governments
- granting municipalities powers over taxation, the provision of public services, and urban planning

== Federalism and political system ==
Currently, two elements characterize Mexican federalism. Federalism has greater political and social influence, and, although it also has economic influence, this has been conditioned by criteria for application that have always been reserved to the federal government. In general, governors from political parties in opposition to the president tend to be the most active and demanding in their negotiations with the federal government. The second is that it is precisely the economic restrictions that have become the main problem for governors with the federation, which has motivated demands for the allocation scheme to be redesigned, since the financial requirements, derived from greater administration and provision of services, have not been accompanied by an equivalent flow of resources.

In terms of the distribution of powers in the Mexican federal system, both in regulatory capacity and in the provision of services, the federal and municipal governments retain exclusive powers. The federal government, among others, has powers in defense, foreign and monetary policies, while the municipal government is responsible for basic urban services in streets, parks, markets, cemeteries and slaughterhouses. In contrast, state governments have few exclusive powers and, in general, are forced to coordinate with the other levels of government both in regulation and in the provision of services as diverse as education and solid waste management.

However, as in other federal systems, in Mexico the formal distribution of powers between national and subnational governments often creates confusion in practice and demands coordination in areas where powers overlap. In areas crucial to quality of life (environment, urban planning, social policies and public safety, among others) the three levels of government participate in both regulation and the provision of services.

As the formal channels of influence on the design and execution of federal public policies (the Senate, the institutional dispute remedy, federal law initiatives by state legislatures) have proven ineffective or slow for state governments, governors (especially those in the opposition) have turned their attention to informal mechanisms of communication with the federal government such as the National Conference of Governors (Conago). Since 2002, the conference brings together governors from all political parties and, as a collective actor, has protected state governments from federal interventions that threaten their sphere of competence, which has strengthened their negotiating position vis-à-vis federal officials, with considerable success in the fiscal area.

With democratization and especially after the election of President Vicente Fox (PAN) in 2000, Mexican subnational governments have been considerably more active in federal politics; they have taken advantage of their new spaces of autonomy and influence as well as those they already had, resorting to three main strategies:

- governors and municipalities have joined the newly created associations to (collectively) influence the national public agenda, to negotiate with the federal government and to lobby federal legislators;
- state legislatures have introduced federal bills more frequently than before (although they have done so individually rather than collectively); and
- los gobiernos municipales (en ocasiones en conjunto) han recurrido a la Suprema Corte para resolver disputas intergubernamentales (sobre todo en casos en los que acusan a los gobiernos estatales de invadir sus esferas de responsabilidad).

== Fiscal federalism ==
The traditional theory of fiscal federalism, a subfield of economic theory concerning the distribution of responsibility among government actors at different levels of government, establishes that the constituent states of a federal pact must have fiscal instruments to fulfill their political, social and financial functions. Economic and political analysis is vital to understanding the effects of these relationships. To raise revenue, governments can resort to taxes, debt, and intergovernmental transfers. This theory proposes that, on the one hand, the central government be in charge of macroeconomic equilibrium, income redistribution, assistance to the poor, as well as the provision of certain public goods such as national defense. On the other hand, it proposes that subnational governments be in charge of the provision of goods and services whose consumption is limited only to their jurisdiction. Responding to local particularities, this type of provision, unlike uniform provision from the center, maximizes the welfare of consumers.

What is known today as the National System of Fiscal Coordination (SNCF) was consolidated in 1980, with the introduction of the value-added tax (VAT). With the introduction of this tax, the states practically ceded to the central government the collection function of their main source of income - the so-called tax on commercial income (ISIM). However, after 1980, the entities continued to collect taxes, that is, participating in their administration, with the understanding that the income obtained belonged to the federal government. In its origin, this system had a fundamentally compensatory character, that is, the resources were distributed to the states to compensate them for the income they obtained in the previous system.

In terms of expenditure, the period prior to 1992 was characterized by a strong centralization of expenditure at the federal level, but above all by the high degree of discretion in its allocation among the federative entities: there were no objective criteria for doing so and, to a large extent, the allocation was defined by the decisions of the executive and its relationship with the governors. Beginning in the 1990s, motivated by the emergence of electoral competition in subnational governments and the emergence of, increasingly, vertically divided governments, this scenario began to change. According to Laura Flamand, the presence of governors opposed to the PRI helped the Mexican federal system to decentralize, at least in fiscal terms.

Over the years, the resource distribution system has undergone changes in the distribution criteria. Until 2007, the General Participation Fund, the most important of the total transfers to the states, was distributed under the following three criteria: 45.17% based on the number of inhabitants, 45.17% based on the so-called territorially assignable taxes, and the remaining 9.66% based on the inverse of the two previous criteria. Starting in 2008, as a result of the tax reform, the increases are additionally governed by GDP growth and the collection of own revenues. However, the impact of these two new criteria will be very small, since the new formula weighs the distribution criteria by population. The resulting system was characterized by a strong concentration of revenue collection in the federal government.

As a result of this process, the federal entities currently receive conditional transfers and unconditional transfers [or shares], which has caused more than half of the expenditure to be carried out by the state and municipal governments, although in some cases they have become mere executors or payers of the federal government. Unlike the decades prior to the nineties, the discretion with which expenditure was allocated in the entities has practically disappeared, since in all cases there are distribution formulas which give governments greater certainty in budgeting and planning.

Currently, state governments in Mexico have five sources of income: own revenues (approximately 8.2% of the average total income of a state in 2005), conditional federal transfers (52.4%), unconditional transfers (35.2%), debt (1.9%) and other revenues (2.3%). Regarding expenditure, it is necessary to emphasize that until 1992 its allocation to subnational governments was very discretionary. As a direct result of the decentralization processes, the state proportion of total government expenditure rose from 22.6 to 28.6% and the municipal proportion from 4.3 to 5.7% between 1995 and 2000. The fraction of expenditure spent by the federal government has decreased by more than eight percentage points during this period; however, it is still the order of government that spends the largest proportion: 65% in 2000.

In fiscal terms, the Mexican federal system is still highly centralized and can be defined by three characteristics: a] in terms of revenue, state governments are highly dependent on federal transfers (on average, approximately 88% of a state's total revenue in 2005); b] in terms of expenditure, an average state determines the final destination of only 40% of the transfers it receives, and c] revenue collection by state and municipal governments has tended to decrease, which can be attributed to the recentralization of expenditure and to the fact that the transfer system does not usually consider revenue collection efficiency criteria. Mexico seems trapped in the past, despite having moved with a neoliberal economy, in accordance with the international environment, the decentralization that was "during the decades of 1980 and 1990, (...) the rule in the countries of Latin America" was not carried out in the country.

Finally, it must be taken into account that, unlike federal spending, which has become highly transparent, transparency and accountability at the level of state and municipal governments leave much to be desired. Furthermore, the marked dependence of state governments on federal transfers has not contributed to the creation of fiscal responsibility mechanisms in the federative entities, since their tax effort has little or no connection with the resources to be spent and, particularly, with the way in which these are used.

== Federalism and public policies ==
The boundaries between the legal powers of each level of government in the different policy areas are often blurred, and decentralization processes have accentuated their overlaps. Until the last decade of the 20th century, federal services, present in all states, coexisted in Mexico with services that subnational governments developed in their territories. Federal and state services coexisted in different combinations: in some entities, federal services dominated, in others, subnational services, but with few coordination mechanisms. Consequently, it is increasingly clear that the design and execution of effective public policies require formal and informal intergovernmental coordination bodies or mechanisms that enable cooperation between the three levels.

=== Health ===
The federal government began decentralizing health care actions in 1983; however, this phase was limited to 14 states and the federal secretariat continued to exercise strict regulatory and budgetary controls. In 1995, a second process of decentralization of health care services began in order to make the operation of the sector that serves the population without social security more efficient. The decentralizing effort reserved normative and regulatory functions for the federal authority, and gave the direct provision of services to the federative entities. At the end of the process, the federal government retained responsibility for financing the development of state health systems through transfers to state governments, but with the complementary objective of maintaining or even increasing the state financial contribution.

=== Education ===
After several efforts to decentralize the administration of basic education from the federal government during the 1970s and 1980s, it was not until 1992 that the decentralization of operational and administrative functions was carried out. Decentralization was intended to promote a culture of co-financing public services with intergovernmental and private resources, and to fragment the National Union of Education Workers in order to weaken its bargaining power, which represented enormous political and economic costs for the federal government. These measures simply meant the transfer of administrative responsibilities, with little decision-making power or sufficient financial resources. For example, state governments must accept annual salary increases for state teachers, which are not negotiated at the state level but at the federal level (between the National Union of Education Workers and the federal Ministry of Public Education).

=== Other policy areas ===
There are other policy areas in which, even when the powers are subnational de jure, the effectiveness of state or municipal policies is related to their intergovernmental nature. For example, policies for controlling air quality or promoting regional development (both of which are state powers), or those for the integrated management of urban solid waste (municipal responsibility) tend to be more effective when the different levels of government are coordinated and when subnational authorities take advantage of financial resources, technical advice and, in general, support from federal authorities. In policy areas crucial to the quality of life of the general population, subnational governments have acquired a more important and influential role over the last two decades: in some cases due to explicit decentralization processes, in others, because local authorities have resumed and taken advantage of the spaces of autonomy granted to them by law.

== See also ==
- Federalism
- Mexico
