= Revolution Day (Mexico) =

Mexican government holiday on November 20

Day of the Mexican Revolution
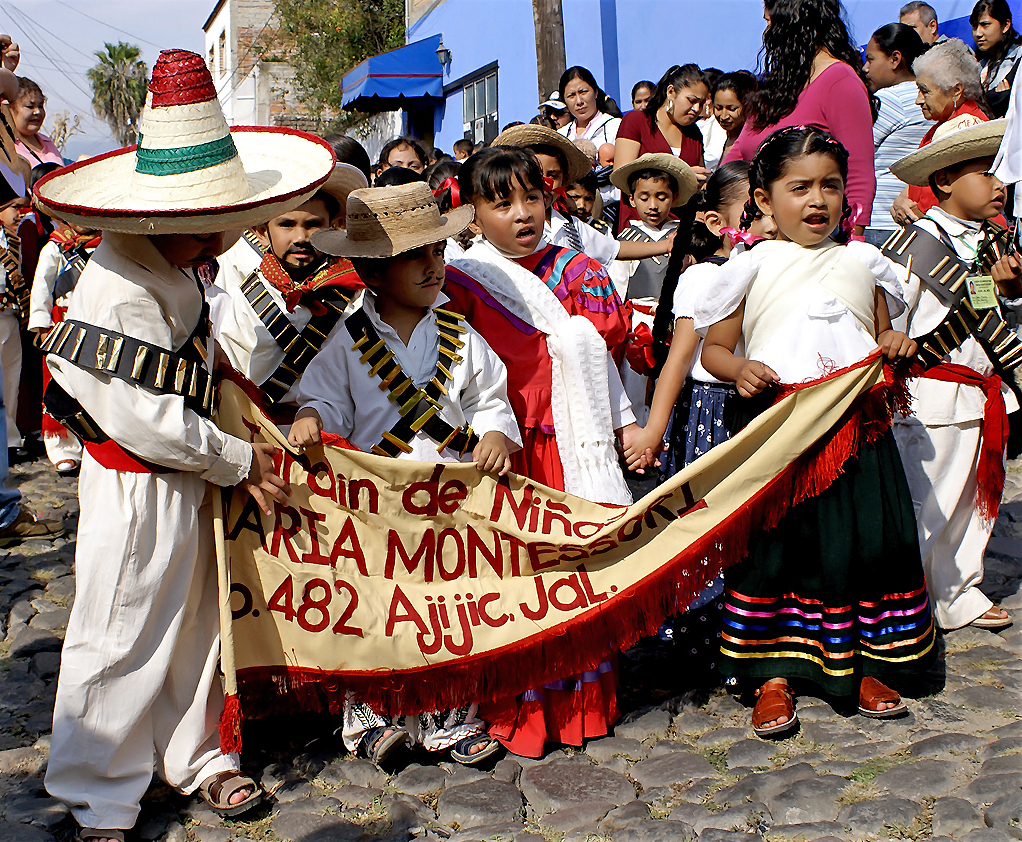
- Children from the Montessori Kindergarten singing La Cucaracha
- Official name: Día de la Revolución Mexicana
- Observed by: Mexico
- Type: National
- Significance: Anniversary of the start of the Mexican Revolution, one of five Fiestas Patrias
- Celebrations: parades
- Date: November 20
- Frequency: annual

Mexican Revolution Day is an official government holiday, celebrated annually in Mexico on November 20, marking the start of what became the Mexican Revolution.

The Mexican Revolution, initiated by Francisco I. Madero on November 20, 1910, led to the overthrow of dictator Porfirio Díaz after his 35-year rule. Madero, who had opposed Díaz in the 1910 election, was imprisoned but escaped, issuing the Plan of San Luis Potosí to declare the election results fraudulent and call for a revolt. The revolution culminated in significant social and political changes, including the 1917 Constitution, which introduced labor reforms like the 8-hour workday, abolished child labor, and promoted equal pay. The commemoration of the revolution is celebrated as a national holiday, though the style of celebration has evolved over the years, including modifications to the parade schedule and location. Since 2006, the holiday has been observed on the third Monday of November, and the 2019 reinstatement of the civil-military-athletic parade marked a return to traditional observances.

== History ==
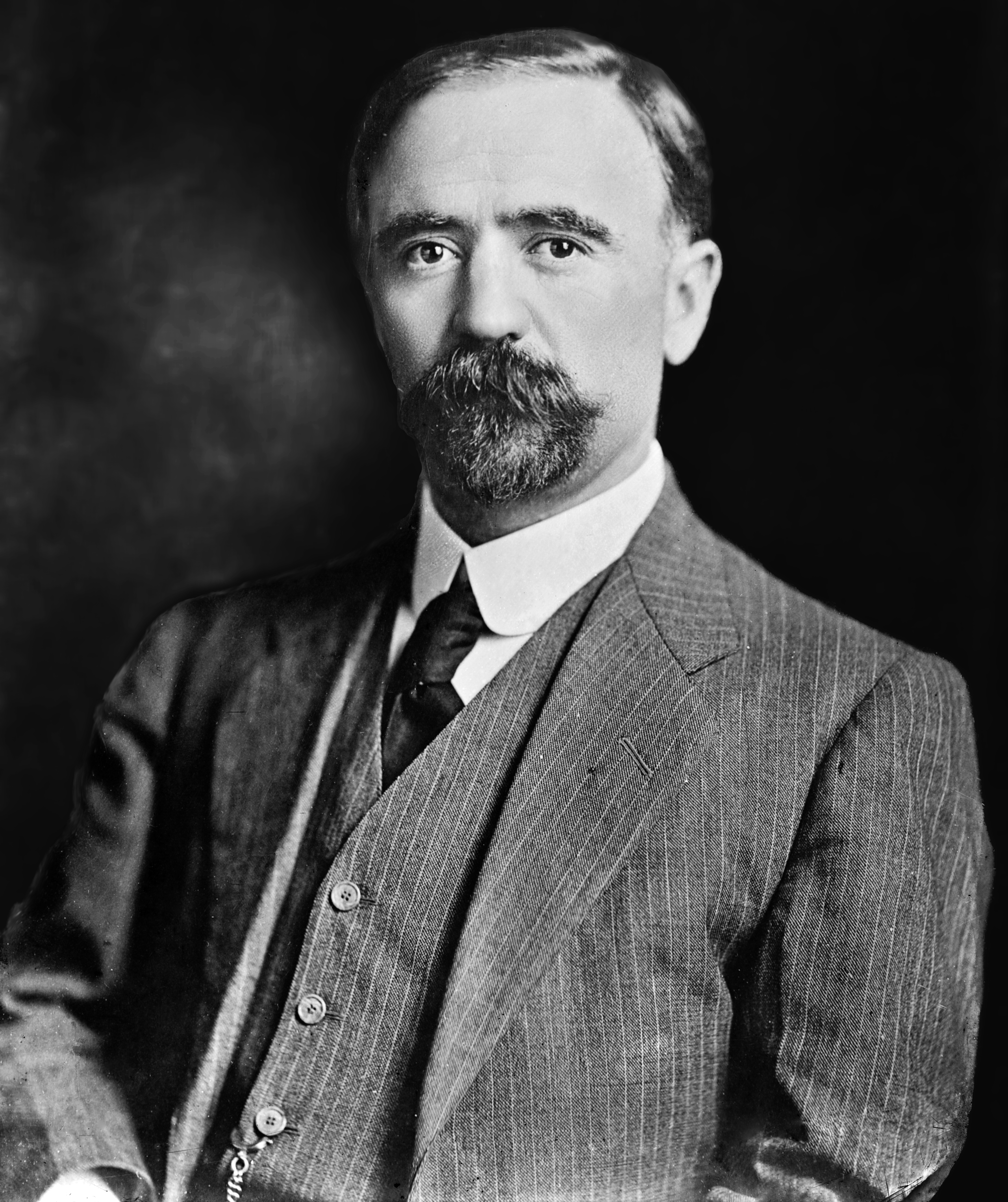
Francisco I. Madero, who called on Mexicans to rise up on November 20, 1910

The Mexican Revolution brought the overthrow of Army general and dictator Porfirio Díaz after 35 years as president of Mexico (1876-1911). In the 1910 presidential election, liberal politician Francisco I. Madero opposed Díaz. Díaz jailed Madero, who then escaped, issuing the Plan of San Luis Potosí on October 6, 1910. In that plan, Madero declared the results of the 1910 election fraudulent, nullified them, asserted that he was provisional president, and called for Mexicans to rise up against Díaz on November 20, 1910. He wrote "Throw the usurpers from power, recover your rights as free men, and remember that our ancestors left us a heritage of glory which we are not able to stain. Be as they were: invincible in war, magnanimous in victory."

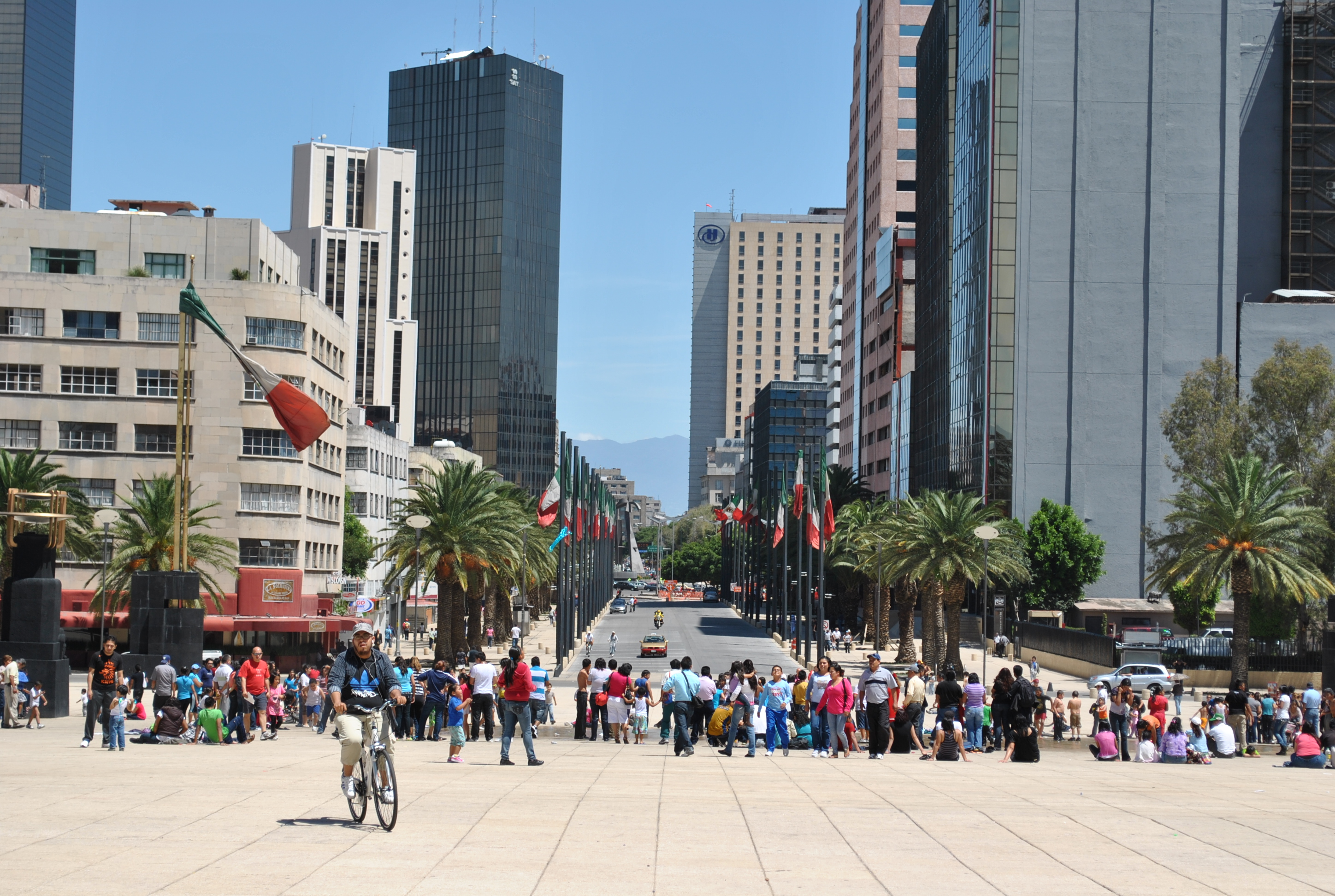
Republic Square.

The commemoration is celebrated in Mexico as an official holiday. Until 2006 and again from 2009 to 2013 the national celebrations were located at the Zocalo in Mexico City. Given the recent political and national tragedies that happened in 2014 the parades were called off at the aftermath of the 2014 Iguala mass kidnapping, (this was the case also in 2015), and the celebrations happened in the Campo Marte in the capital, thus pushing the national parade up to November 23, Navy Day, with only Mexican Navy personnel in attendance. Thus the national November 20 parades, during the remaining years of the Enrique Peña Nieto presidency, had now been replaced by state level ones, which have been held in major cities all over the nation as per tradition, but in a reduced basis, given recent cancellations due to protest actions on the said date in several state capitals. During the presidency of Andrés Manuel López Obrador, the traditional civil-military-athletic parade was finally reinstated in 2019.

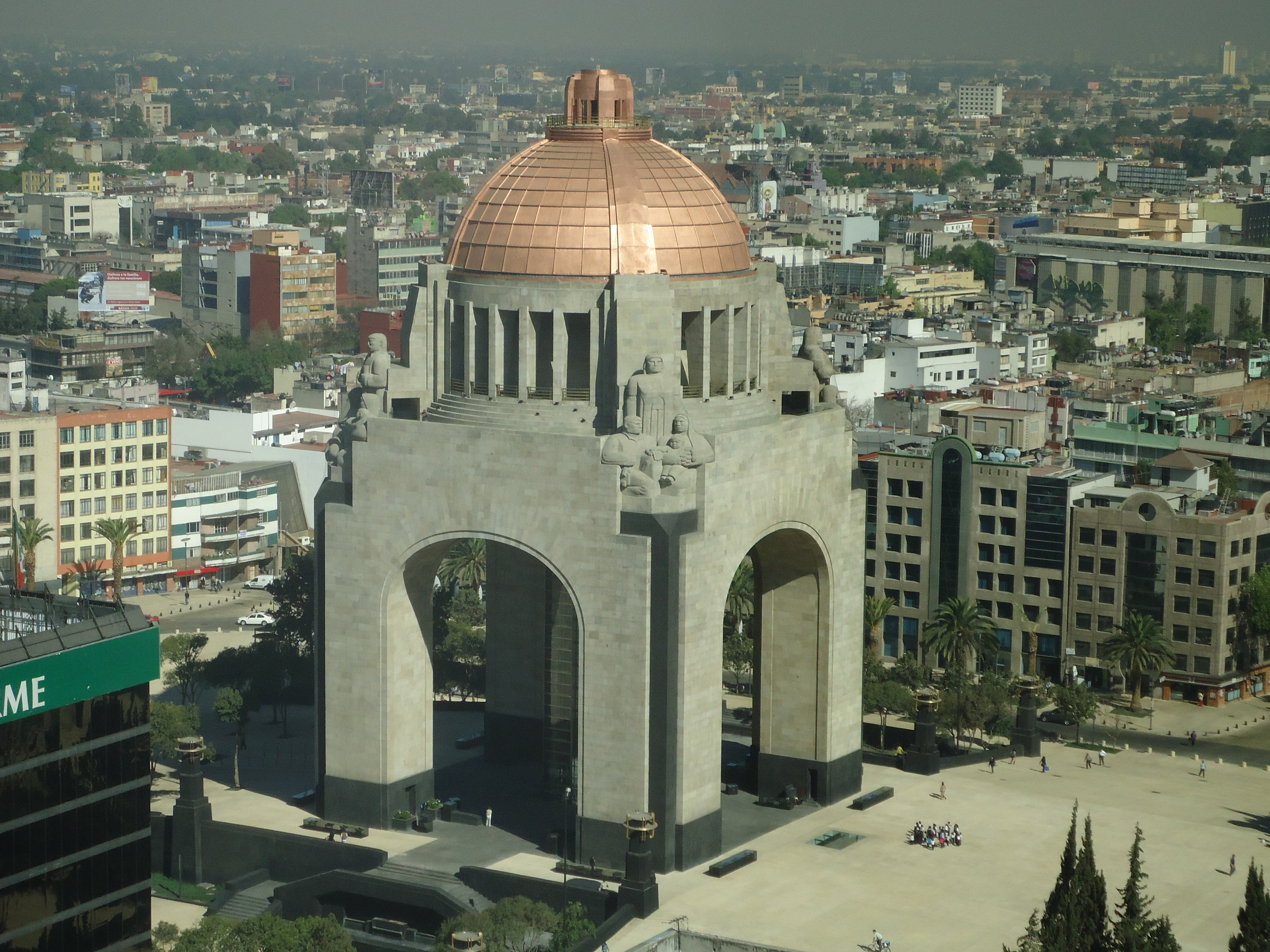
On the Commemoration of the Centenary of the Mexican Revolution the Federal District Government carried out the rehabilitation and restoration of Republic Square, Monumento a la Revolución (Monument to the Revolution) and National Museum of the Revolution.

The first crucial revolution during the 20th century was the Mexican Revolution. The Mexican Revolution drove many Mexicans to migrate to the United States. The constitution created in 1917, in response to the revolution, established limits on the period of time politicians could be in power. The Constitution also included labor reform laws that covered 8 hour workdays, abolished child labor, and established equal pay.

== Date ==
Article 74 of the Mexican labor law (Ley Federal del Trabajo) provides that the third Monday of November (regardless the date) will be the official Day of the Revolution holiday in Mexico. This was a modification of the law made in 2005, effective since 2006; before then, it was November 20 regardless of the day, and all schools gave extended holidays if the day was a Tuesday or Thursday.

== See also ==
- Public holidays in Mexico
- Revolution Day — in other countries
- Emiliano Zapata
- Francisco I. Madero
- Ricardo Flores Magón
- Mexican Revolution
- Plan of San Luis Potosí
