= Rómulo Díaz de la Vega =

President of Mexico in 1855

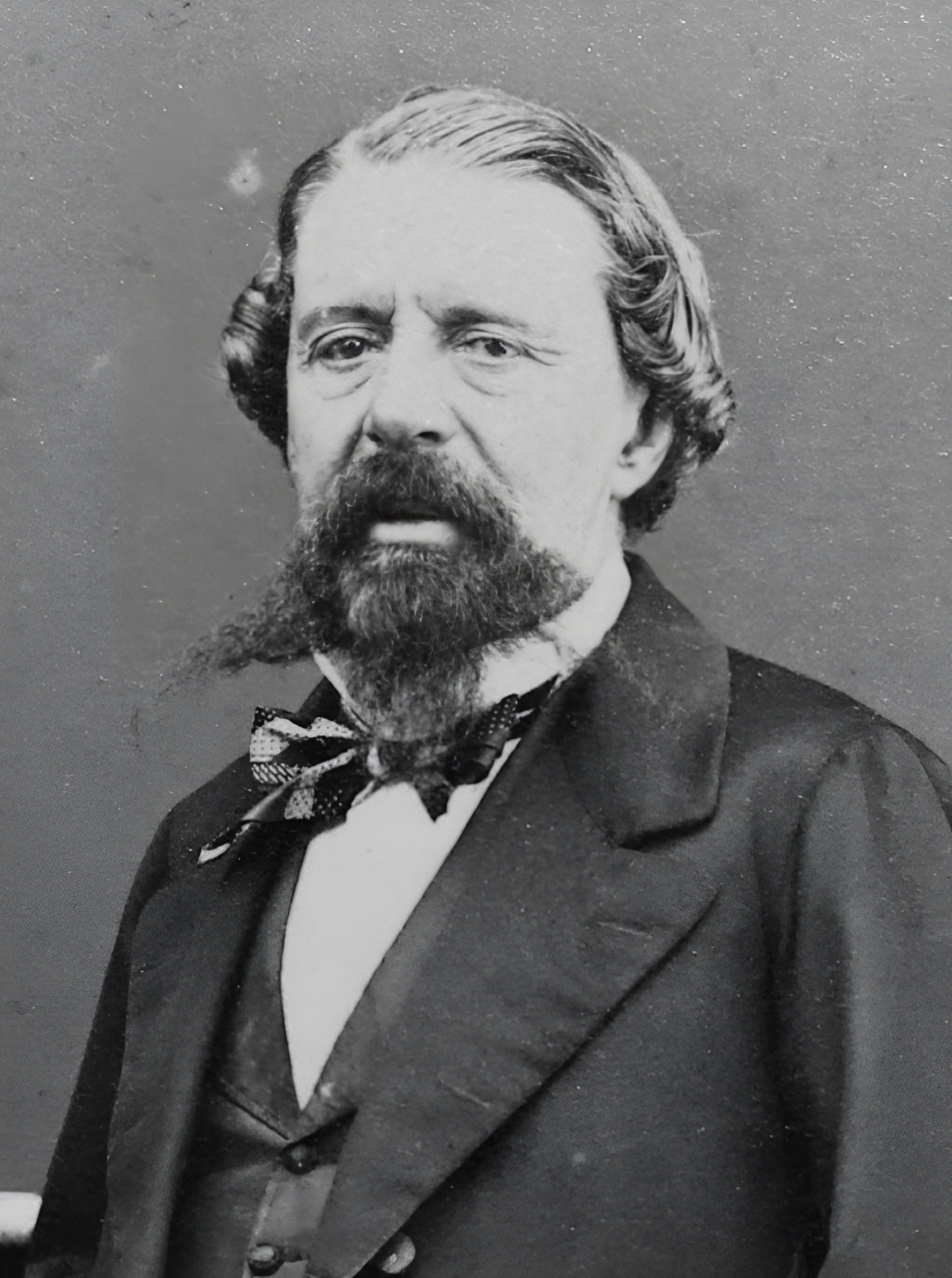

23rd President of Mexico
- In office 12 September 1855 – 3 October 1855
- Preceded by: Martín Carrera
- Succeeded by: Juan Álvarez

Personal details
- Born: 23 May 1800 Mexico City, Viceroyalty of New Spain
- Died: 3 October 1877 (aged 77) Puebla, Mexico
- Party: Conservative

José María Rómulo Díaz de la Vega Fuentes (23 May 1800 — 3 October 1877) was a Mexican military officer and politician. As commander of the garrison in Mexico City, he was the de facto president of Mexico in 1855, after the resignation of President Martín Carrera during the revolutionary Plan of Ayutla left a power vacuum.

== Biography ==
In 1821, he joined the Plan of Iguala. He fought in the Texas War of Independence and for that he was appointed lieutenant. He fought in 1838 against the French invasion during the Pastry War. He also fought in the Mexican-American War and he was captured at the Battle of Resaca de la Palma on May 9, 1846.

When Martín Carrera left the presidency of the Republic in 1855, Díaz de la Vega, supported by the leaders of the military garrison, assumed the duties of President until the revolutionary leader Juan Álvarez arrived at Mexico City to assume the presidency. His government lasted 22 days, from 12 September to 3 October 1855.

After his presidency, Díaz de la Vega was a member of the Assembly of Notables who invited Maximilian of Habsburg to be emperor in 1863. After the triumph of the Republic, he was sentenced to two years imprisonment, but the penalty was switched to confinement in Puebla, where he died in October 1877, aged 77.

== See also ==
- List of heads of state of Mexico

Political offices
Preceded by Martín Carrera	President of Mexico; 12 September - 3 October 1855	Succeeded by Juan Álvarez
