= Plan of Veracruz (1822) =

1822 call to revolt against Mexican emperor Agustín de Iturbide by Santa Anna

In the history of Mexico, the Plan of Veracruz was a call to revolt against Emperor of Mexico Augustín de Iturbide, proclaimed by Antonio López de Santa Anna at the port of Mexico on December 2, 1822. It was ratified on December 6.

== Background ==
Agustín de Iturbide, after declaring the independence of Mexico, entered Mexico City on September 27, 1821. A few days later, Santa Anna entered Veracruz. On October 25, 1822, Iturbide named Santa Anna Commander of the Province of Veracruz, during which time he was in favor of the Empire. But he changed his mind when Iturbide dissolved the Constituent Congress and tried to remove him from his post.

== Proclamation ==
On December 2, 1822, Santa Anna ruled against the empire of Iturbide and the republic for supporting Guadalupe Victoria. Santa Anna promised to follow the principles of the Plan of Iguala, addressed to the population with the following arguments:

- He said that when the country had emancipated seeking independence had sought equality, justice and reason.
- Mexico had a representative government elected by a Congress that had been dissolved by Iturbide.
- The aim of his proclamation was to restore a representative assembly of the nation.
- the principles of the Plan of Iguala would be respected and defendant against whom atentase nation against its principles would be considered. An armistice is signed with the royalist forces remaining in the castle of San Juan de Ulua.
- freedom of maritime rotation with the peninsula would be restored.

The original plan was expanded and was made up of twenty-six clauses. It was ratified on December 6. In the new document it noted that a congress would meet to decide a form of government to continue the principles of religion, independence, and unity. With this plan, Santa Anna lost battles at the beginning of the uprising, but with the proclamation of the Plan of Casa Mata and support of other rebel leaders defeat the forces of Iturbide was encouraged.

== See also ==
- Independence of Mexico
- First Mexican Empire
- Treaty of Córdoba
- Plan of Iguala
- Plan of Casa Mata

== Bibliography ==
- Arias, Juan de Dios; Olavarría y Ferrari, Enrique de (1880). "México independiente". México a través de los siglos. En Vicente Riva Palacio. Vol. IV. México: Ballescá y compañía.
- Pedrero, Enrique González (1993). País de un solo hombre: La ronda de los contrarios. Fondo de Cultura Económica. ISBN 968-16-3962-6.
