= Cerro El Veladero =

Mountain in Guerrero, Mexico

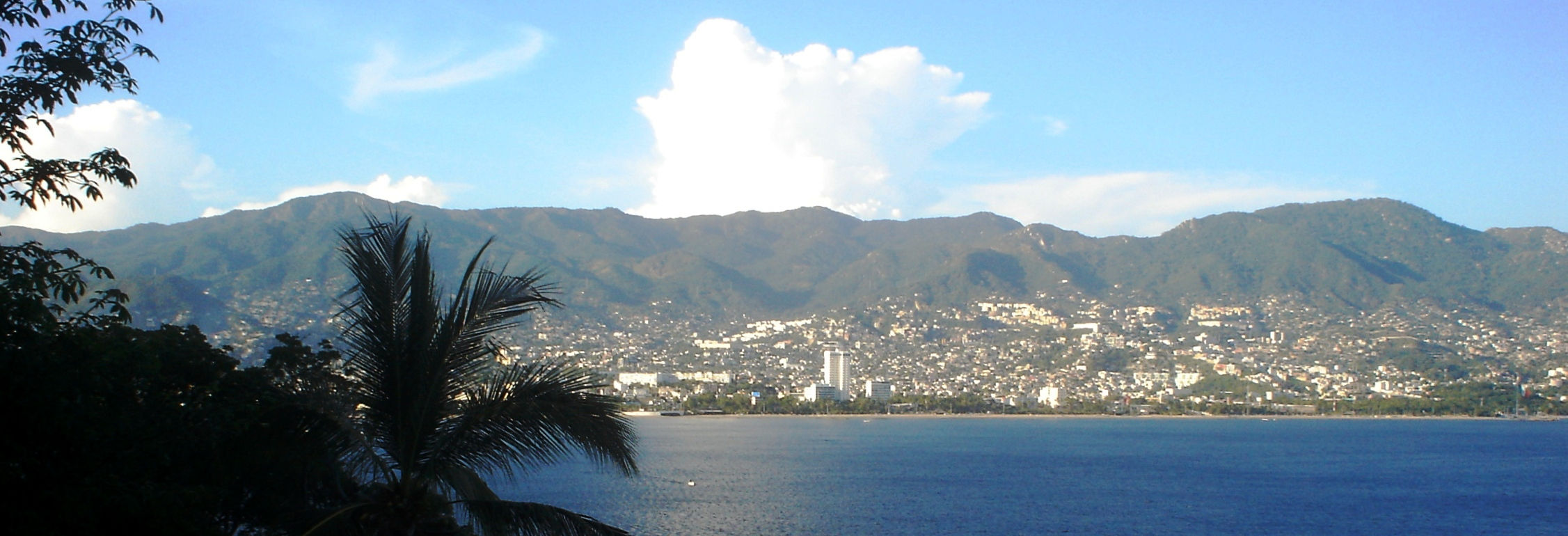
- The mountain rising behind Acapulco

Highest point
- Elevation: 918 m (3,012 ft)
- Coordinates: 16.911868°N 99.896564°W

Geography
- Location within Mexico
- Location: Guerrero, Mexico

The Cerro El Veladero is a mountain in the state of Guerrero to the north of Acapulco.

== Location ==
The Cerro El Veladero is southwest of El Veladero (Veladero Morelos), northwest of Carabalí and northeast of Pueblo Nuevo. The mountain has an elevation of 918 metres (3,012 ft). It was the site of the Battle of El Veladero during the Mexican War of Independence.

== Park ==
The mountain is protected by the Parque nacional El Veladero, created in 1980 with an area of almost 3,160 hectares (7,800 acres). The park was created with the goal of improving the environment of the area known as the amphitheater of Acapulco Bay and the Cerro Veladero, which has historical importance. Vegetation is medium forest with isolated oaks. Fauna include songbirds, osprey, iguana and boa.

== Sources ==
- "Cerro El Veladero", mapcarta
- "Cerro El Veladero", visitacapulco.com.mx (in Spanish)
