= Battle of El Veladero =

- Part of the Mexican War of Independence
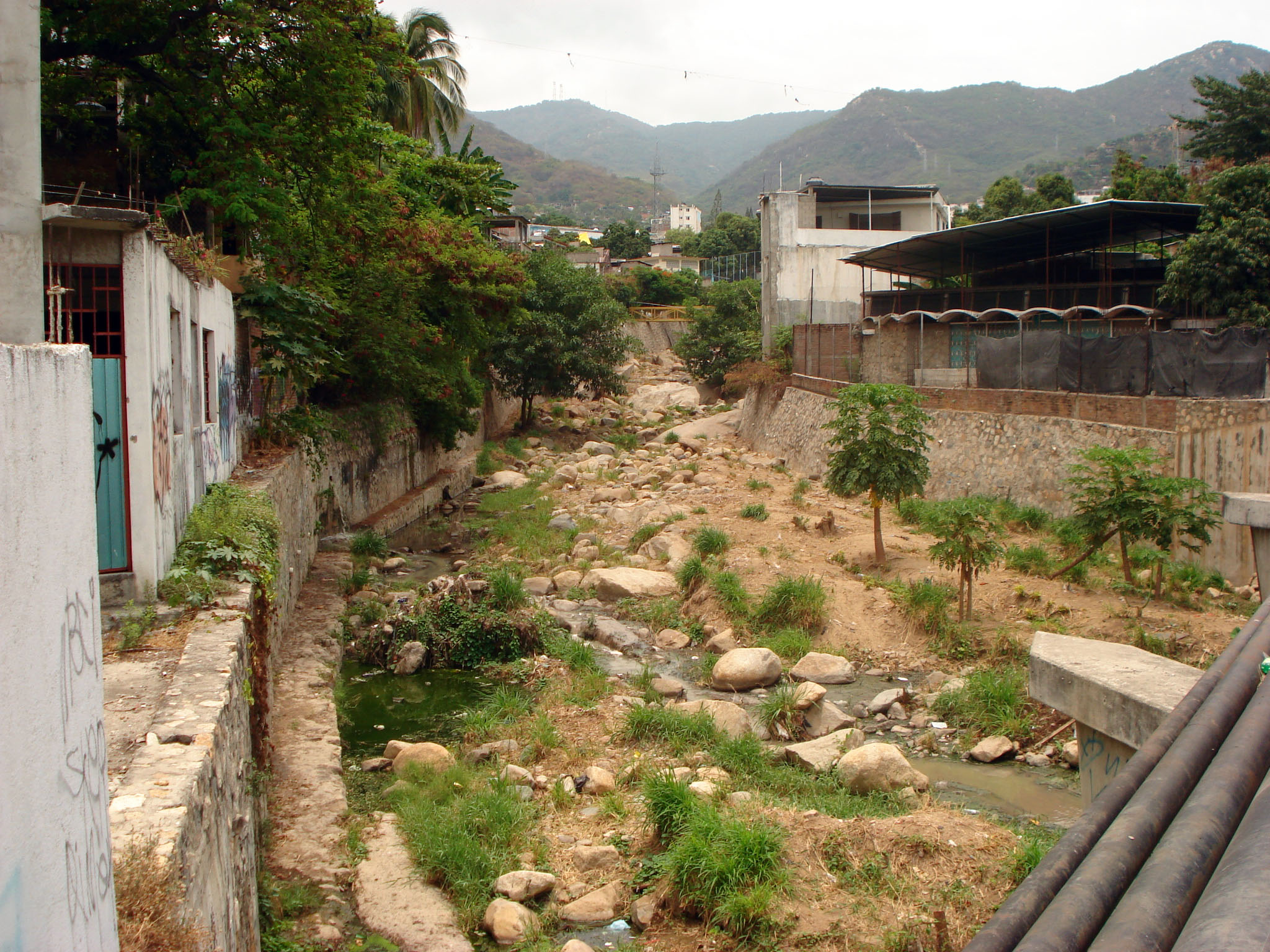
- A view of Cerro El Veladero from the Puente de la Avenida Constituyentes, Acapulco.
Date	1810 – 30 April 1811
Location	Cerro El Veladero, Acapulco de Juárez, Mexico
Result	Rebel victory

Belligerents
Mexican Rebels	Spanish Empire

Commanders and leaders
José María Morelos; Rafael Valdovinos; Vicente Guerrero; Bravo Guerrero	Juan Antonio Fuentes

Strength
700 soldiers	Unknown

The Battle of El Veladero was a battle of the War of Mexican Independence that occurred from 1810 to 30 April 1811 at Cerro El Veladero, Acapulco de Juárez. The battle was fought between royalist forces loyal to the Spanish crown, commanded by Juan Antonio Fuentes, and Mexican rebels, commanded by José María Morelos and Rafael Valdovinos, fighting for independence from the Spanish Empire. The rebels won.

== Context ==
In 1811, Morelos arrived with his army to the area around Carácuaro, Michoacán de Ocampo and began to issue notices to the local population about the popular uprising initiated by Miguel Hidalgo, a movement Morelos himself had joined at Indaparapeo when he had met Hidalgo. Hidalgo had named Morelos a lieutenant and commissioned him to operate in the south of the country where the important port city of Acapulco was situated. On his return to Carácuaro, Morelos raised his own army and traveled to the state of Guerrero to conduct his first military campaign which took place between October 1810 and August 1811.

== The battle ==
With his stated intent to capture the strategic city of Acapulco, Morelos decided that it was vital to take the high ground at the Cerro del Veladero as this mountain surrounded the entire port city. Morelos sent 700 men, under the command of Captain Valdovinos, to take the mountain. Valdovinos was unable to initially take the mountain and was dislodged by royalist forces, losing his position on the mountain. While these actions were taking place, the Guerrero brothers, Bravo and Vicente, arrived at the battle and bolstered the rebel forces with their own soldiers.

The two sides took up strategic positions around El Valedero and Acapulco, with skirmishes occurring frequently between the two sides, until 30 April 1811 when the forces commanded by Morelos were able to overrun the mountaintop and force the Spanish forces to retreat.
