= Plans in Mexican history =

In Mexican history, a declaration of principles of a rebellion

In Mexican history, a plan was a declaration of principles announced in conjunction with a rebellion, usually armed, against the central government of the country (or, in the case of a regional rebellion, against the state government). Mexican plans were often more formal than the pronunciamientos that were their equivalent elsewhere in Spanish America and Spain. Some were as detailed as the United States Declaration of Independence. Some plans simply announced that the current government was null and void and that the signer of the plan was the new president.

A total of more than one hundred plans were declared. One compendium, Planes políticos, proclamas, manifiestos y otros documentos de la Independencia al México moderno, 1812–1940, compiled by Román Iglesias González (Mexico City: UNAM, 1998), contains the full texts of 105 plans. About a dozen of these are widely considered to be of great importance in discussions of Mexican history.

== Chronological list of Plans ==
Plan	Date and Location	Notes
Plan of Iguala	24 February 1821, Iguala, Guerrero (Note: Geographical references are to modern-day federal entities, some of which did not exist, or existed in another form, at the time of the plans' enactment.)	The proposal by Agustín de Iturbide and Vicente Guerrero for the post-Independence War settlement based on the "Three Guarantees" of Religion, Independence and Unity.
Plan of Veracruz	2 December 1822	Antonio López de Santa Anna calls for the creation of a republic.
Plan of Casa Mata	1 February 1823	Antonio López de Santa Anna and Guadalupe Victoria called for the removal of Emperor Agustín de Iturbide.
Plan of Lobato	23 January 1824	An unsuccessful 1824 revolt led by José María Lobato against Spanish influence in the government of independent Mexico.
Plan of Perote	16 September 1828	Antonio López de Santa Anna demands nullification of the 1828 election results.
Plan of Jalapa	4 December 1829, Xalapa, Veracruz	Conservatives demanding the removal of President Vicente Guerrero.
Plan of Veracruz	2 January 1832	Ciriaco Vázquez, later supported by Antonio López de Santa Anna, denounced Anastasio Bustamante.
Plan of Huejotzingo	8 June 1833, Huejotzingo, Puebla	Mariano Arista denounced the liberal reforms of Valentín Gómez Farías and expressed support of Antonio López de Santa Anna.
Plan of Cuernavaca	25 May 1834	Denouncing the liberal reforms of Valentín Gómez Farías.
Plan of La Ciudadela	4 September 1841	Rebellion against Anastasio Bustamante.
Plan of Hospicio	20 October 1852	Conservative rebellion calling for Antonio López de Santa Anna to be president. Succeeded in 1853.
Plan of Ayutla	24 February 1854, Ayutla, Guerrero	Liberal coalition calling for the removal of President Antonio López de Santa Anna.
Plan of Tacubaya	17 December 1857, Tacubaya, Federal District	Calling for the suspension of the 1857 Constitution, convocation of a constituent assembly under President Ignacio Comonfort.
Plan de la Noria	8 November 1871	Porfirio Díaz's failed attempt at overthrowing Benito Juárez.
Plan of Tuxtepec	10 January 1876	Porfirio Díaz's proclamation of the "No Re-election" principle as well as a call to overthrow the current president, Sebastián Lerdo de Tejada.
Program of the Liberal Party	1 July 1906, St. Louis, Missouri	Ricardo Flores Magón and others. Sweeping political program that challenged the regime of Porfirio Díaz and called for radical reforms. Many of its provisions were incorporated into the current 1917 Constitution.
Plan of San Luis Potosí	6 October 1910, San Luis Potosí, San Luis Potosí	Francisco I. Madero's call for Revolution and the overthrow of Porfirio Díaz on 20 November 1910.
Plan of Ayala	25 November 1911, Ciudad Ayala, Morelos	Emiliano Zapata's vision of post-Revolution Mexico.
Plan Orozquista	25 March 1912, "Chihuahua Headquarters" of Pascual Orozco	Declaration of rebellion against Francisco I. Madero. Orozco's Plan included important articles addressing socio-economic issues of land reform and workers' rights.
Plan of Guadalupe	23 March 1913, Hacienda de Guadalupe in Ramos Arizpe, Coahuila	Venustiano Carranza's response to the assassination of Francisco I. Madero during the Ten Tragic Days, and denunciation of the usurper Victoriano Huerta. Additions to the plan widened its scope into reforms.
Pact of Torreón	4 July 1914	The agreement was nominally an updating of Carranza's Plan of Guadalupe drawn up by two division commanders of the Constitutionalist Army, Pancho Villa of the Division of the North and Pablo González Garza of the Division of the Northeast. It pressed for socio-economic reforms that were not part of the Plan of Guadalupe and designed to push Carranza to act.
Plan of San Diego	6 January 1915, San Diego, Texas	Ambiguous in origin, it was either a Carrancista or Huertista plan to overthrow the governments of the American border states.
Plan of Agua Prieta	23 April 1920, Agua Prieta, Sonora	Álvaro Obregón, Adolfo de la Huerta, and Plutarco Elías Calles take up arms against the government of Venustiano Carranza.

== See also ==
- Politics in Mexico
- History of Mexico
