= Plan of Guadalupe =

1913 manifesto by Mexican revolutionary Venustiano Carranza

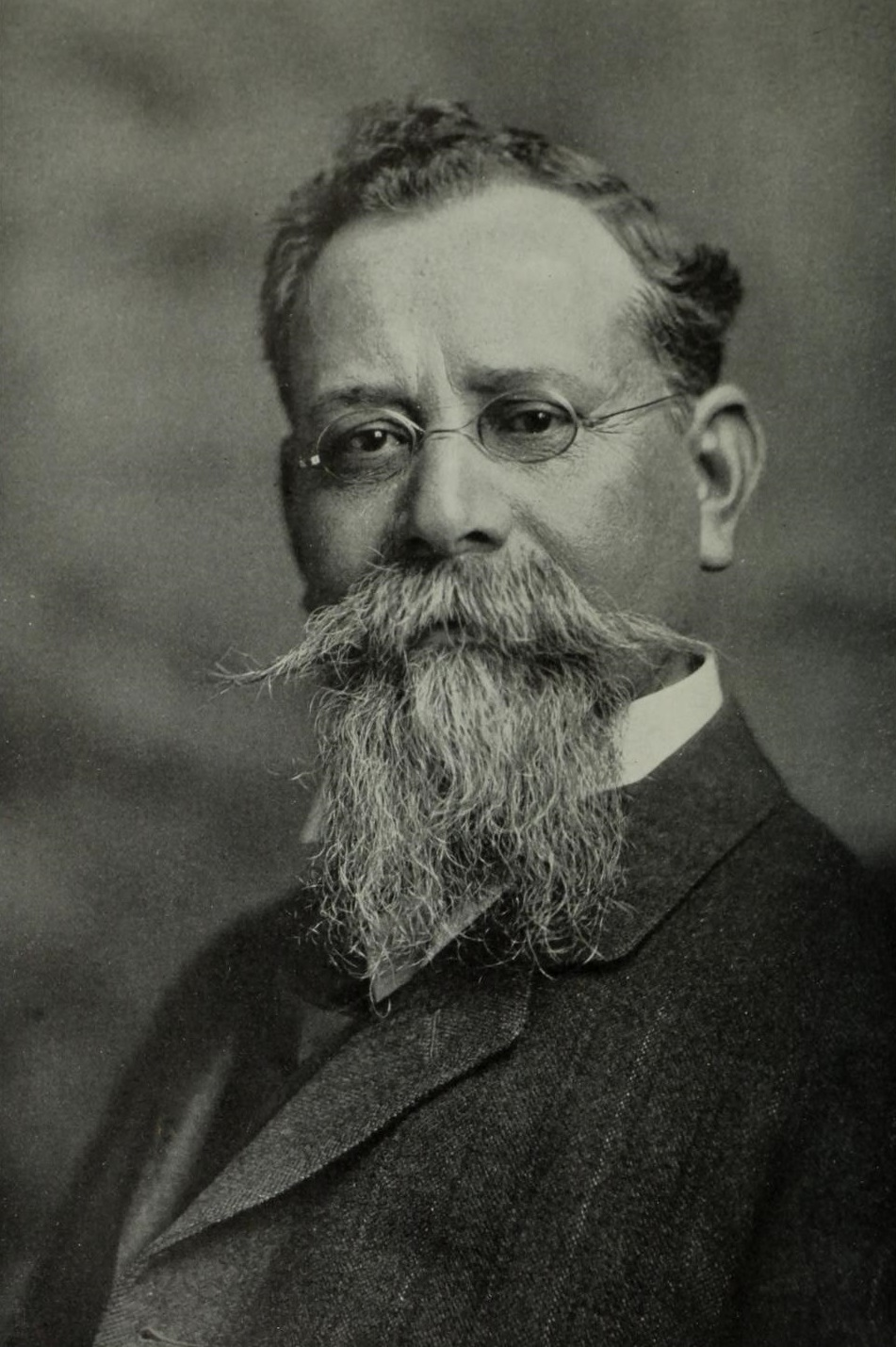
Venustiano Carranza, author of the Plan of Guadalupe

In the history of Mexico, the Plan of Guadalupe (Spanish: Plan de Guadalupe) was a political manifesto which was proclaimed on March 26, 1913, by the Governor of Coahuila Venustiano Carranza in response to the reactionary coup d'etat and execution of President Francisco I. Madero, which had occurred during the Ten Tragic Days of February 1913. The manifesto was released from the Hacienda De Guadalupe, which is where the Plan derives its name, nearly a month after the assassination of Madero. The initial plan was limited in scope, denouncing Victoriano Huerta's usurpation of power and advocating the restoration of a constitutional government. In 1914, Carranza issued "Additions to the Plan of Guadalupe", which broadened its scope and "endowed la Revolución with its social and economic content." In 1916, he further revised the Plan now that the Constitutionalist Army was victorious and revolutionaries sought changes to the 1857 Constitution of Mexico. Carranza sought to set the terms of the constitutional convention.

== Background ==
Carranza was a dedicated supporter of fellow Coahuilan Francisco I. Madero. Huerta's "military dictatorship, notable for political corruption and rule by imprisonment and assassination" juxtaposed the formerly "liberal" government which he was appointed the minister of war in Madero's Revolutionary cabinet. Although there had been scattered rebellions against Huerta, there was no unified plan for the revolutionaries. Carranza was one of the most prominent and well-known opposers of Huerta: he was the then-sitting governor of the state of Coahuila. His plan initially united anti-Huerta forces in his home state, but other revolutionary groups signed onto it. The plan became the official program of the northern revolutionaries. It was subscribed to by leading figures of the Mexican Revolution such as Pancho Villa, Álvaro Obregón, and Felipe Ángeles. One scholar has called the plan "oft-mentioned and highly overrated," but the plan did attract widespread support for the anti-Huerta coalition, despite its solely political demands. In December 1914, Carranza issued "Additions to the Plan of Guadalupe", which directly addressed land reform and reforms to improve the lives of workers and peasants.

== Description of the Plan ==
The Plan was divided into seven statements which aimed to repudiate the legitimacy of Huerta's government. The statements reject Huerta as president, including the legislative and judicial branches and any state supporting his administration. The plan designated the collective of the northern revolutionary forces, the Constitutionalist Army. It was to be recognized as a legitimate military force, with Carranza as "First Chief" (Primer Jefe). This articulated Carranza's belief that "the only way the revolutionaries would ever be able to maintain themselves in power was by destroying the old federal army." The plan gave Carranza interim power over Executive Power until peace was restored and then call for new elections.

== Text of the Plan ==
The text of the plan is brief and available online in Spanish.

Manifesto to the Nation:

Considering that General Victoriano Huerta, to whom the constitutional President Don Francisco I. Madero had trusted the defense of the institutions and legality of his Government, when siding with the enemies who rebelled against that same Government, to restore the latest dictatorship, committed the crime of treason to scale in power, arresting the President and Vice-president, as well as their Ministers, demanding of them by violent means to renounce their posts, which is verified by the messages that the same General Huerta sent to the Governors of the States communicating to them that he had taken prisoner the Supreme Magistrates of the Nation and their Cabinet. Considering that the Legislative and Judicial Powers in spite of the laws and constitutional rules have recognized and protected General Victoriano Huerta and his illegal and unpatriotic procedures, and considering, of having violated the sovereignty of those States, whose Governors should have been the first to not recognize him, the following subscribers, Chiefs and Officers commanding the constitutional forces, have agreed and will sustain with arms the following:

PLAN

1. General Victoriano Huerta is not recognized as President of the Republic.
2. The Legislative and Judicial Powers of the Federation are also not recognized.
3. The Governments of the States that still recognize the Federal Powers that form the present Administration, are also not recognized thirty days after the publication of this Plan.
4. For the organization of the army entrusted with fulfilling our intentions, we name as First Chief of the Army that will be denominated Constitutionalist, the citizen Venustiano Carranza, Governor of the State of Coahuila.
5. When the Constitutionalist Army occupies Mexico City, the citizen Venustiano Carranza, First Chief of the Army, will be in interim charge of the Executive Power, or whoever would have substituted him in command.
6. The interim president of the republic will call for general elections as soon as the peace has been consolidated, handing over power to the citizen who is elected.
7. The citizen acting as First Chief of the Constitutionalist Army in the states whose governments have recognized that of Huerta, will assume command as provisional governor and will call for local elections, after having taken possession of their posts the citizens having been elected to carry out the powers of the federation, as called for by the previous rule.

March 26, 1913

== Additions to the Plan, 12 December 1914 ==
The initial plan was extremely narrow in scope, bringing together northern forces that defeated Huerta and gained U.S. backing against his regime. Carranza insisted on the narrowness of the plan, which did not include demands for socioeconomic reforms. In his time as First Chief, Carranza managed the northern revolutionary groups, but after Huerta was ousted and the Federal Army was dissolved, Constitutionalist General Pancho Villa broke with Carranza and allied with peasant revolutionary Emiliano Zapata, who had never adhered to the Plan of Guadalupe, having created the Plan of Ayala. Constitutionalist General Alvaro Obregón remained loyal to Carranza. Carranza issued amendments to the Plan of Guadalupe on 12 December 1914, which for the first time "promised agrarian and social reforms, legitimizing the efforts of his more radical supporters and undercuttting the popular appeal of his enemies," By this time, the revolutionary forces that had been united against Huerta were poised for all-out civil war of the revolutionary winners. Zapata and Villa were much more radical than Carranza, so that to win over potential followers of those two, Carranza issued the Additions to the Plan of Guadalupe, signed by Carranza and his chief of staff, Adolfo de la Huerta.

Article 2 articulates the envisioned socioeconomic reforms.

Article 2. The First Chief of the Revolution vested with Executive Power will expedite and put into effect during the struggle all the laws, dispositions and measures designed to give satisfaction to the economic, social, and political necessities, thus accomplishing the reforms which public opinion demands as indispensable for establishing the regime, which may guarantee the equality of Mexicans among themselves; [for promoting] agrarian laws which will favor the formation of small property by dissolving the big landholdings [latifundios] and restoring to the people the lands of which they were unjustly deprived; [for drafting] fiscal laws designed to secure an equitable system of taxation on real estate; [to design] legislation to improve the condition of the rural peasant, of the laborer, of the miner, and the working classes in general; [to secure] establishment of municipal liberty as a constitutional institution; [to provide] bases for a new system of organization of an Independent Judicial Branch, both in the Federation and in the States; [to order] revision of the laws relative to marriage and the civil state of persons; [to declare] dispositions which guarantee the strict fulfillment of the laws of the [Liberal] Reform, revision of the Civil, Criminal, and the Commercial codes; reforms of judicial procedure with the aim of expediting and making effective the administration of justice, revision of laws relative to the exploitation of mines, oil, water, timber, and the natural resources of the country, and to prevent this being done in the future; [to institute] reforms which may guarantee the faithful application of the Constitution of the Republic, and in general to provide laws which may be deemed necessary in order to assure to the inhabitants of the country the full and effective enjoyment of their rights and of equality before the law.

Article 3 lays out implementation of the reforms, with the "Chief of the Revolution" empower to use the Constitutionalist Army for that purpose, and conveys on him other sweeping powers.

Article 3. In order to be able to continue the struggle and in order to be able to bring to accomplishment of the work of the reforms which are referred to in the preceding Article, the Chief of the Revolution is expressly authorized to convoke and to organize the Constitutionalist Army and to direct the operations of the campaign; [he is authorized] to name governors and military commanders of States and to remove them freely; he is also to make expropriations on grounds of public welfare which may be necessary for division of lands, the funding of towns, and other public services; [he is authorized] to contract loans and to issue notes on the National Treasury with indication of the properties which will guarantee them; he may also name and freely remove federal employees as well as those of the civil administration of States to make directly or through the Chiefs [jefes] which he may authorize the requisitions of lands, buildings, arms, horses, vehicles, provisions, and other necessities of war; and to establish military decorations and to decree recompense for services devoted to the Revolution.

== Additions to the Plan, 14 September 1916 ==
By September 1916, Villa had been defeated by Constitutionalist General Obregón and Zapata had returned to guerrilla warfare in Morelos. Carranza now looked to a constitutional convention to revise the 1857 Liberal Constitution. Carranza's "Decree Revising Certain Articles of the Plan of Guadalupe" updates the December 1914 additions to the original plan, reformulating articles 4, 5, and 6, in light of the Constitutionalist victory. Article 4 now calls for a Constituent Congress, with himself as Chief of the Constitutionalist Army setting the time and place. It further stipulates the apportionment of representatives by states and territories and excludes anyone hostile to the Constitutionalist cause from being elected a delegate. In Article 5, Carranza states he will provide a draft of the revised Constitution to the delegates. In Article 6, he mandates limiting discussion to the draft constitution. He puts the delegates on a short timeline of two months to complete the revisions of the constitution. In Article 7, he mandates the dissemination of the decree to all parts of the Republic.

== Ship name ==
The former USS Dolphin (PG-24) was acquired by Mexico on 25 February 1922 and renamed the Plan de Guadalupe, serving until circa 1927.

== See also ==
- Mexican Revolution
- Plans in Mexican history
- Timeline of Mexican history
