= Pimentel (surname) =

Coat of arms of the House of Pimentel

The Pimentel family is an old Iberian aristocratic family that belonged to both Portuguese and Spanish nobilities.

Pimentel is also a Portuguese, Spanish, Sephardic Jewish surname denoting pepper - merchant/trader of plants and spices.

== Individuals with this surname ==
- Abraham Cohen Pimentel (died 1697), Portuguese Sephardic Dutch Rabbi
- Alejandro Sanchez Pimentel (born 1959), Dominican basketball-player
- Antonio Pimentel de Prado (1604-1671/72), Spanish officer and diplomat
- Antonio Pimentel Tlahuitoltzin (16th century), ruler of Texcoco
- António de Serpa Pimentel (1825-1900), Portuguese Prime Minister
- Aquilino "Nene" Pimentel Jr. (1933-2019), Filipino human rights activist
- Aquilino "Koko" L. Pimentel III (born 1964), Filipino politician and lawyer
- Daniel Kenedy Pimentel Mateus dos Santos (born 1974), Portuguese footballer
- David Pimentel (1925–2019), environmental science professor
- Diego Carrillo de Mendoza y Pimentel (died 1631), Spanish viceroy
- Eduardo Pimentel (disambiguation)
- Eleonora Fonseca Pimentel (1752-1799), Italian poet and revolutionary)
- Eloá Pimentel, hostage victim
- Esmeralda Pimentel (born 1989), Mexican actress and model
- Fernando Álvarez de Toledo y Pimentel (1507-1582), Spanish duke
- Fernando Pimentel (born 1951), Brazilian politician and economist
- Gaspar de Guzmán y Pimentel (1587-1645), Spanish duke and prime minister
- Genaro Gongora Pimentel (born 1937), Mexican jurist
- George C. Pimentel (1922-1989), American inventor of the chemical laser
- Gerardo García Pimentel (1983-2007), Mexican journalist
- Henriëtte Pimentel (1876-1943), Dutch teacher and nurse murdered at Auschwitz
- Isaías Pimentel (1933-2017), Venezuelan tennis player
- Jessica Pimentel (born 1982), American actress and musician
- Jesús Pimentel (born 1940), Mexican boxer
- Joel Pimentel, founding member of Miami boy band CNCO
- Jose Pimentel Ejercito (born 1963), Filipino politician
- Jupitter Pimentel, Brazilian rapper
- Lito Pimentel (born 1963), Filipino film and television actor
- Luisa Pimentel-Ejercito (born 1930), Filipino politician and first spouse
- María Josefa Pimentel, Duchess of Osuna, 12th Duchess of Benavente (1752-1834)
- Mickey Pimentel (born 1985), American football player
- Miguel Jontel Pimentel (born 1985), American singer
- Osvaldo Lenine Macedo Pimentel, known as Lenine, (born 1959), Brazilian singer
- Pepe Pimentel (1929–2013), Filipino television personality and game show host
- Richard Pimentel (born c. 1948), American disability rights activist
- Rod Pimentel, American politician
- Rodrigo P. Pimentel, American political analyst and DREAMer
- Rodrigo R. Pimentel (born 1972), Brazilian police officer
- Samelene Bernardo Pimentel (born 1974), First Filipino to ski to the North Pole and South Pole
- Ronald Pimentel (born 1985), football player
- Sávio Bortolini Pimentel (born 1974), Brazilian footballer
- Stolmy Pimentel (born 1990), Dominican baseball player
- Thiago Pimentel Gosling (born 1979), Brazilian footballer
- Timothy Mark Pimentel Eigenmann (born 1981), Filipino actor known as Sid Lucero
- Valentín Pimentel (born 1991), Panamanian footballer
- Wanda Pimentel (1943–2019), Brazilian painter

== History ==
The association with peppers and spices suggests the name's roots in farming and trade and the cultivated lands themselves.

Ancestry of the surname has been linked to João Afonso Pimentel, a Portuguese knight.

The name spread throughout the Portuguese Empire and the subsequent Portuguese Sephardic Jewish diaspora, as well as the House of Pimentel, a Spanish noble family of Portuguese origin (Benavente) established in the Crown of Castile.

In the history of the Jews in Portugal, the name is often traced to Sephardi Jews, specifically the conversos to Catholicism during the Portuguese Inquisition. Tribunal records now maintained in the Torre do Tombo National Archive contain hundreds of examples of New Christian Pimentels who were accused of relapsing into Judaism by the tribunals of the Portuguese inquisition..

The Pimentel surname was associated with prominent Portuguese Christian & New Christian spice traders throughout the 16th & early 17th centuries.
