= Rodrigo Pimentel =

Rodrigo Pimentel may refer to:

- Rodrigo P. Pimentel, U.S. immigration activist
- Rodrigo R. Pimentel, Brazilian Military Police officer
