= Woolpert =

Woolpert is a surname. Notable people with the surname include:

- David Woolpert, American politician
- Paul Woolpert, American basketball coach and scout
- Phil Woolpert (1915–1987), American basketball coach

== See also ==
- Woolpit
