= Two Rabbit =

Two Rabbit may refer to:

- Ometochtli, a Mesoamerican calendrical name in Classical Nahuatl, with the literal meaning of "two rabbit"
- Carlos Ometochtzin (d. 1539), an Acolhua noble, whose surname means "Two Rabbit"
