= Lepore =

Lepore or LePore may refer to:

Lepore is an Italian surname (stressed on the first syllable in Italian), a regional variant of the surname Lepre, meaning hare, originally a nickname for a fleet-footed or timid person.

- Agustina Lepore (born 1988), Argentine tennis player
- Amanda Lepore (born 1967), American model, socialite, singer and performance artist
- Cal Lepore (1919–2002), American football referee
- Curtis Lepore (born 1983), American actor, musician and internet celebrity
- Davide Lepore (born 1968), Italian voice actor and dubbing director
- Ernest Lepore (born 1950), American philosopher and cognitive scientist
- Francesco Lepore (born 1976), Italian latinist, journalist and LGBTQ activist.
- Franco Lepore (born 1985), Italian footballer
- Jill Lepore (born 1966), American historian
- Kirsten Lepore, American animator
- Lyn Lepore (1961–2025), Australian paralympic tandem cyclist
- Michele Lepore-Hagan (born 1955), Representative of the 58th district of the Ohio House of Representatives
- Nanette Lepore (born 1964), American fashion designer
- Theresa LePore, Supervisor of Elections for Palm Beach County, Florida
- Tony Lepore (born 1947), American police officer

== Other ==
- The Lepore Extrusion, musical album released in 2006
