= Eduardo Osorio =

Eduardo Osorio is an author and journalist born in 1957 in Toluca, Mexico. His major work is the book Club Obrero, which deals with homosexuality and conservatism. On 2012, he published El juego del gato y el alfil, a novel winner of the Ignacio Manuel Altamirano contest prize from the Universidad Autónoma del Estado de México.

== Biography ==
Involved in the Journalist Youth Generation (Spanish, Generación de los periodistas niños) since 15, he worked in journalism for about 35 years, writing articles, caricatures, and editorials, and directing several newspapers. His most representative work was produced during the four years he worked for the newspaper El Sol de Toluca. He has won several awards for his articles and interviews, including the National Award for Journalism (El Premio Estatal de Periodismo). He lived in various places, including the Federal District of Mexico, Monterrey, Guanajuato, Guadalajara, and Chihuahua.

His first work was Stories for Suicides and Lovers (Cuentos para suicidas y enamorados). This was followed by Club Obrero: fantasticas nocturnidades en Chihuahua, inspired and influenced by the social and cultural tumult he witnessed as a journalist in Chihuahua and supported by a grant from the Toluca Center for Writers. He won the National Award for Literature (El Premio Nacional de Literatura) for his narrative The Year that the Devils Were Crowned (El año en que se coronaron los diablos). He has also written plays, including Einstein Against the Pirate of the Fifth Dimension; essays, such as Batalla por el Eco y el Aire; and poetry.

He has been the coordinator of the Toluca Center for Writers since 1997.

== His Work ==
=== Narrative ===
- Club Obrero: fantasticas nocturnidades en Chihuahua.
- Batalla por el Eco y el Aire.
- Historias Megalopolitanas
- El Año en que se Coronaron los Diablos.
- Cuentos breves para suicidas y enamorados
- El Enigma Carmen

=== Poetry ===
- El patio de mi casa
- Bromas para mi padre

=== Other ===
- Theater: Einstein contra el pirata de la quinta dimension
- Essay: Batalla por el Eco
