= Oztoticpac Lands Map of Texcoco =

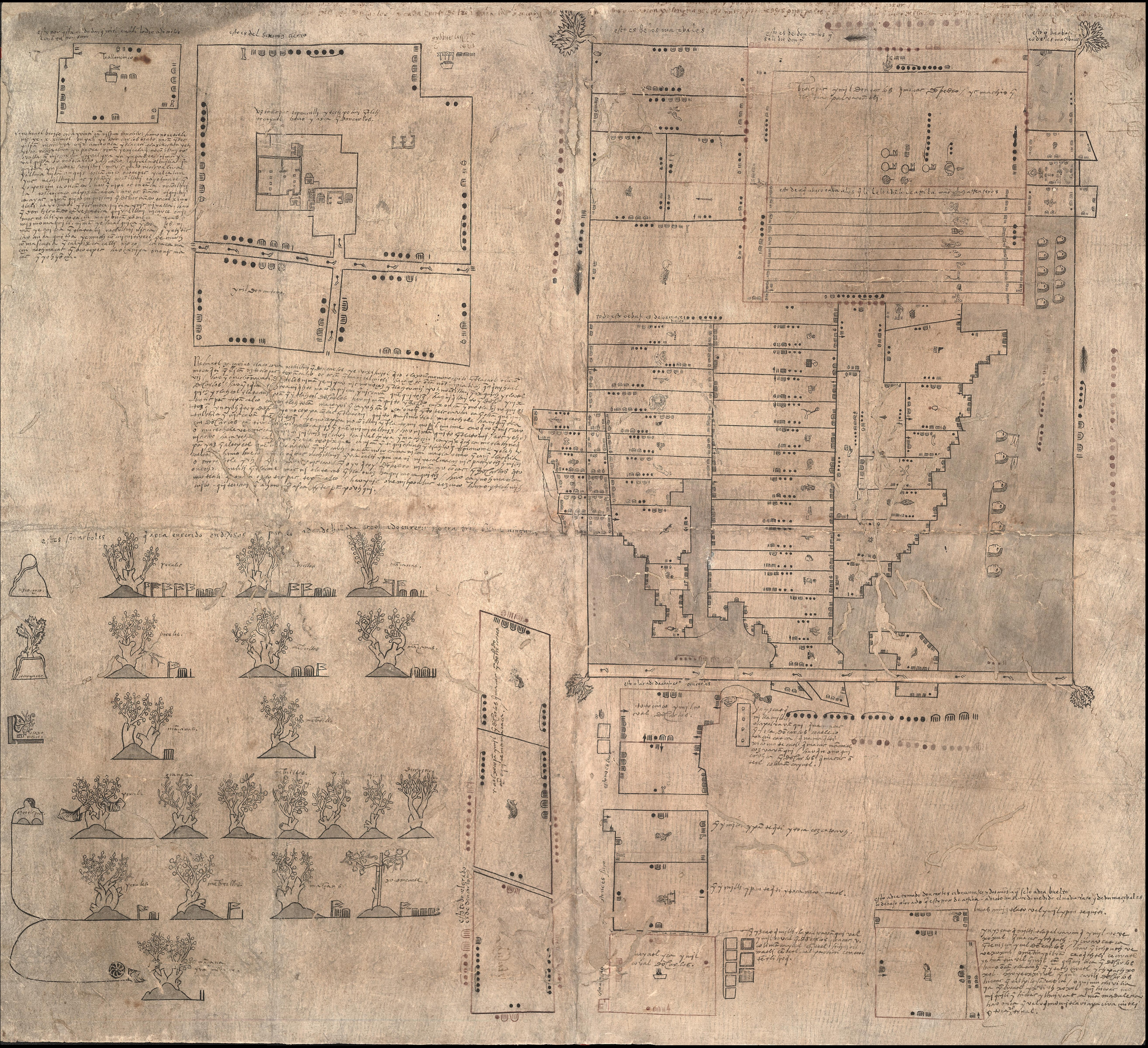
Oztoticpac Lands Map

The Oztoticpac Lands Map of Texcoco is a pictorial Aztec codex on native paper (amatl) from Texcoco ca. 1540. It is held by the manuscript division of the Library of Congress, measuring 76 cm × 84 cm (29 29/32 by 33 1/16 inches) and now on display in the Library of Congress as part of its permanent exhibition "Exploring the Early Americas". The contents are both pictorial and alphabetic text in Nahuatl in red and black ink. The glosses indicate it deals with lands that Texcocan lord Ixtlilxochitl I may have given to Don Carlos Ometochtzin Chichimecatecotl of Texcoco, a son of Nezahualpilli, and litigation over the lands' ownership. Don Carlos was tried and executed by Bishop Juan de Zumárraga under his inquisitorial powers in 1539. The Oztoticpac Lands Map was likely created between 1540 and 1544, perhaps commissioned by Antonio Pimentel Tlahuilotzin, governor of Texcoco, as part of an effort to reclaim land held by Don Carlos. The map shows a palace held by Don Carlos in Oztoticpac. In the schematic cadastrals of 75 pieces of land, the map shows Nahua families who farmed the land as well as the measurements of the plots. A number of these properties were rented by tenants with standard glyphic representations of the rents. The names of the pieces of land are indicated with toponymic glyphs. The Oztoticpac Lands Map has been linked to another indigenous pictorial, the Humboldt Fragment VI held by the Staatsbibliothek of Berlin.

A unique, interesting, and important feature of the map is depictions of fruit trees, both European and local, many of them grafted. Pears, quince, apple, pomegranates, peaches, and grapevines are shown. Income from the sale of fruit would have increased the value of the property. The importation of European fruit trees is part of the Columbian Exchange, but what is especially significant is not only that the trees were integrated into local horticulture, but also that the trees were grafted, a practice to increase the health and yield of the plants. There was also a lawsuit by one Pedro de Vergara against the Holy Office of the Inquisition over trees owned by the late Don Carlos, who was executed following his Inquisition trial in 1539.

Scholars have grappled with the size of plots of land depicted. Cline created a chart with units of measurement, but was cautious about calculating the size of plots, since it was unclear what unit of measure was being used. Others also grappled with the problem of translating Nahua glyphs for units of measure in the OLM to modern measurements to calculate plot size. In 1991, H.R. Harvey published his argument that there were two different units of measurement depicted in the OLM, and made calculations based on his knowledge of Aztec arithmetic. Other scholars have continued to study the OLM's paleography.

The importance of the OLM and its densely packed information on a relatively small map has prompted scholars from its first discovery to enlarge sections of the map so that the details can be seen. This is now possible digitally at the Library of Congress website.

The Library of Congress considers the map one of the gems of its collection and in April 2018 hosted a webinar, now archived along with the transcript, focusing on it.
