= Autonomous University of Mexico State =

Coordinates: 19.2839°N 99.6781°W

- Universidad Autónoma del Estado de Mexico (UAEM)
- Former names: Instituto Literario del Estado de México 1828–1942; Instituto Científico y Literario de Toluca (ICLA) 1943–1956
- Motto: Patria, Ciencia y Trabajo
- Motto in English: Fatherland, Science and Work
- Type: Public university
- Established: March 1828 (Institute); 1956 (University)
- Rector: Carlos Eduardo Barrera Díaz
- Students: 84,654 approx.
- Location: Toluca, Mexico State, Mexico
- Colors: Green and gold
- Website: www.uaemex.mx

The Autonomous University of Mexico State (Spanish: Universidad Autónoma del Estado de México) (UAEM) is a public university in the State of Mexico, Mexico. It is the largest university institution in the state with over 84,500 students, with its central campus located in the state capital of Toluca. Formalised as a university under the UAEM name in 1956, the institution traces its origins back to 1828 with the foundation Instituto Literario del Estado de México, in the former state capital of Tlalpan. In 1943 the institution was augmented to become the Instituto Científico y Literario de Toluca (ICLA), and thirteen years later obtaining its present name and institutional status.

== History ==
=== Liberal era ===
Mexico was born as an independent country in 1821. Don Guadalupe Victoria, the first president of the nation, saw the need to create educational institutions throughout the country to provide education to people, especially the indigenous population, who did not have access to it during colonial times.

The Political Constitution of the State of Mexico was signed in Texcoco in 1827; some of its articles established the creation of an institution that managed all levels of public education. That year, the capital of the state moved to San Agustín de las Cuevas, today known as Tlalpan. It was there, in the Casa de las Piedras Miyeras (House of the Miyeras Stones), that the new Seminary inaugurated by governor Lorenzo de Zavala, started classes on September 4.

On March 3, 1828, this school became the Literary Institute of the State of Mexico, after receiving the approval of the State Congress, which was chaired by José María Luis Mora. While the latter and Lorenzo de Zavala were liberals, each had a different vision for the Institute. Mora believed freedom was the most important moral value that could be transmitted to students, so he thought the Institute had to be financially supported by citizens, without the interference of the state government. However, Zavala advocated toward equality. He believed that a school had to be financed with public funds and scholarships to favour young people from different regions who had limited resources.

It was Zavala's idea that prevailed, thus the local Congress declared that poor and preferably indigenous students should be sent to the Institute from each town or district supported by the public treasury.

The first curriculum included courses on Law, in order to turn young people into fair rulers. Foreign language courses such as French, English and German, were mandatory, since books could only be read in those languages. Likewise, Drawing classes were a must, since they were part of the comprehensive education the Institute intended to provide to students.

In 1830, the seat of the government powers moved to Toluca, and so did the Institute, as stipulated in its creation decree. In Toluca, students were lodged in the Convento de La Merced, which became the first site of the Institute in the capital of the State, but this did not last long. In 1833, Lorenzo de Zavala expropriated a property known as "El Beaterio", with the purpose of locating the Institute there.

"El Beaterio" was a large house in Toluca intended to host "beatas", women who lived under certain rules and were devoted to educating girls. However, this objective was never met. Instead, a chapel and two schools for girls were built, one for the Spanish girls and another for the indigenous ones respectively. After the Mexican War of Independence, since the place had been practically abandoned and was guarded only by a nun, Lorenzo de Zavala decided to expropriate the land and turn it into the new premises for the Institute.

With the establishment of the centralist government in Mexico, which lasted from 1835 to 1846, state institutes all over the country were closed by decree of president Antonio López de Santa Anna. However, on November 7, 1846, after being appointed as interim governor of the State of Mexico, Francisco Modesto de Olaguíbel signed a decree establishing the reopening of the Literary Institute, an initiative attributed to the Secretary of War and Finance, Ignacio Ramirez Calzada, El Nigromante. Seven months later, on June 7, 1847, the Institute reopened and students from different parts of the State arrived due to the restoration of scholarships to students of municipalities across the state.

In 1849, after the Mexican-American War, the American army arrived in Toluca and took over the Institute as headquarters, which forced students to take refuge in the Convento del Carmen. This is how the cloister became a temporary seat of the Institute.

During this time, and prior to the War of the Reform, church, state and education went hand in hand. In fact, the first rector of the school founded in 1827, which later became the Institute, was Priest José María Alcántara.

When Archduke Maximilian of Habsburg arrived in Toluca in October 1864, as part of his national tour to learn about people's needs across the country, he stayed at the Convento del Carmen. When he realized how deteriorated the building was, he promised to send a bag of gold coins for its restoration. However, his promise was not kept, either because he never intended to do so or because he did not have the opportunity, as he was imprisoned and executed in 1867.

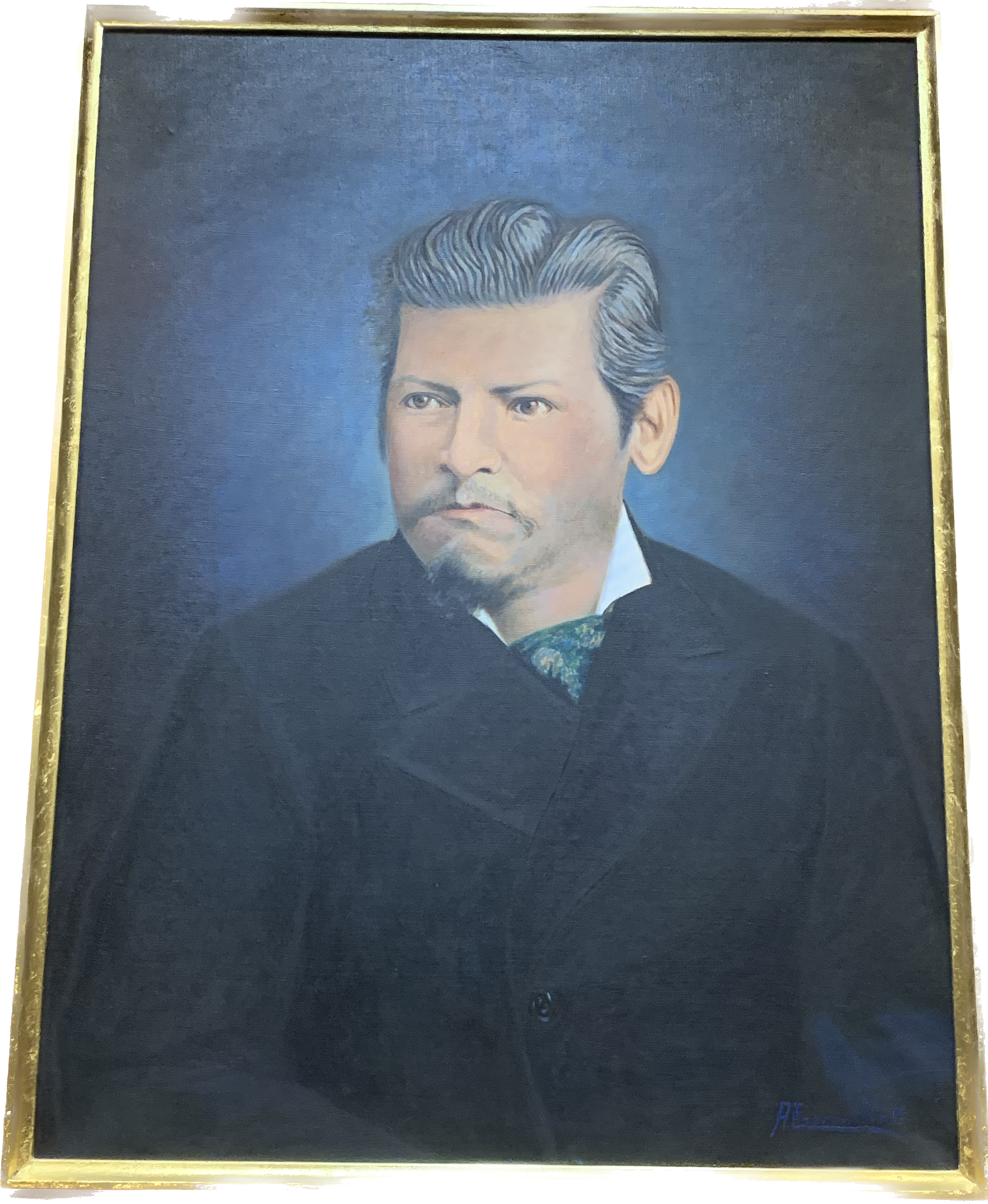
Ignacio Manuel Altamirano

In the Institute, there were two emblematic characters: Ignacio Manuel Altamirano, and Ignacio Ramírez Calzada, El Nigromante. Like many other children, Altamirano received a municipal scholarship to study at the Institute. He was an intelligent indigenous child from the community of Tixtla, now state of Guerrero. At the Institute, he met Ignacio Ramírez, who had been invited to teach but would never become his professor, at least not formally.

Altamirano was not old enough to attend his lectures, but he would sneak around and listen to his lessons from outside the classroom. They became friends and, eventually, colleagues, since Altamirano started to study law at the National Autonomous University of Mexico. In general, he was known for being a rebellious child, and since he did not allow others to mock him or other indigenous children because of their background, he became a protector of the younglings.

In honor of such remarkable characters, the UAEM awards the most outstanding teachers and students of each generation with the Ignacio Ramirez Calzada and the Ignacio Manuel Altamirano medals, respectively.

As a result of the interference of the church in the education system, the Institute's education was tinted with religious elements at the beginning. For instance, every morning students, whether living at the boarding school or not, had to pray and sing a religious hymn, whose last stanza mentioned the Father, the Son and the Holy Spirit.

At that time, comprehensive education involved arts. Felipe Sánchez Solís, who was once director of the Institute, taught drawing classes for a while, and when he was no longer able to continue, he asked permission to call Felipe Santiago Gutiérrez, a painter graduated from the Academy of San Carlos who had caused a huge stir by showing a nude painting for the first time. For this, he was not acclaimed in Mexico since society was conservative at that time. However, in Colombia, he not only achieved the status of excellent painter, but also managed to establish a school. Another graduate from the Academy of San Carlos who joined the institute as a professor was Luis Coto y Maldonado, an artist from Toluca who was ver keen on portraying the city, as opposed to José María Velasco, who preferred painting landscapes.

It is because of Coto y Maldonado's work that interesting aspects of the Toluca of that time are known today, such as the original white color of the facade of the famous portals of the city, captured in the painting entitled Los Portales.

From all the institutes created between 1825 and 1879, the first one was the Colegio Civil del Estado de Puebla. The Literary Institute of the State of Mexico, which received this name in 1828, was the sixth. Some of these institutes still exist, such as el Ateneo Fuente de Coahuila, el Instituto Veracruzano, el Colegio Rosales de Sinaloa, el Italiano Tamaulipeco, and el Colegio Primitivo y Nacional de San Nicolás de Hidalgo in Michoacán.

=== Positivist era ===
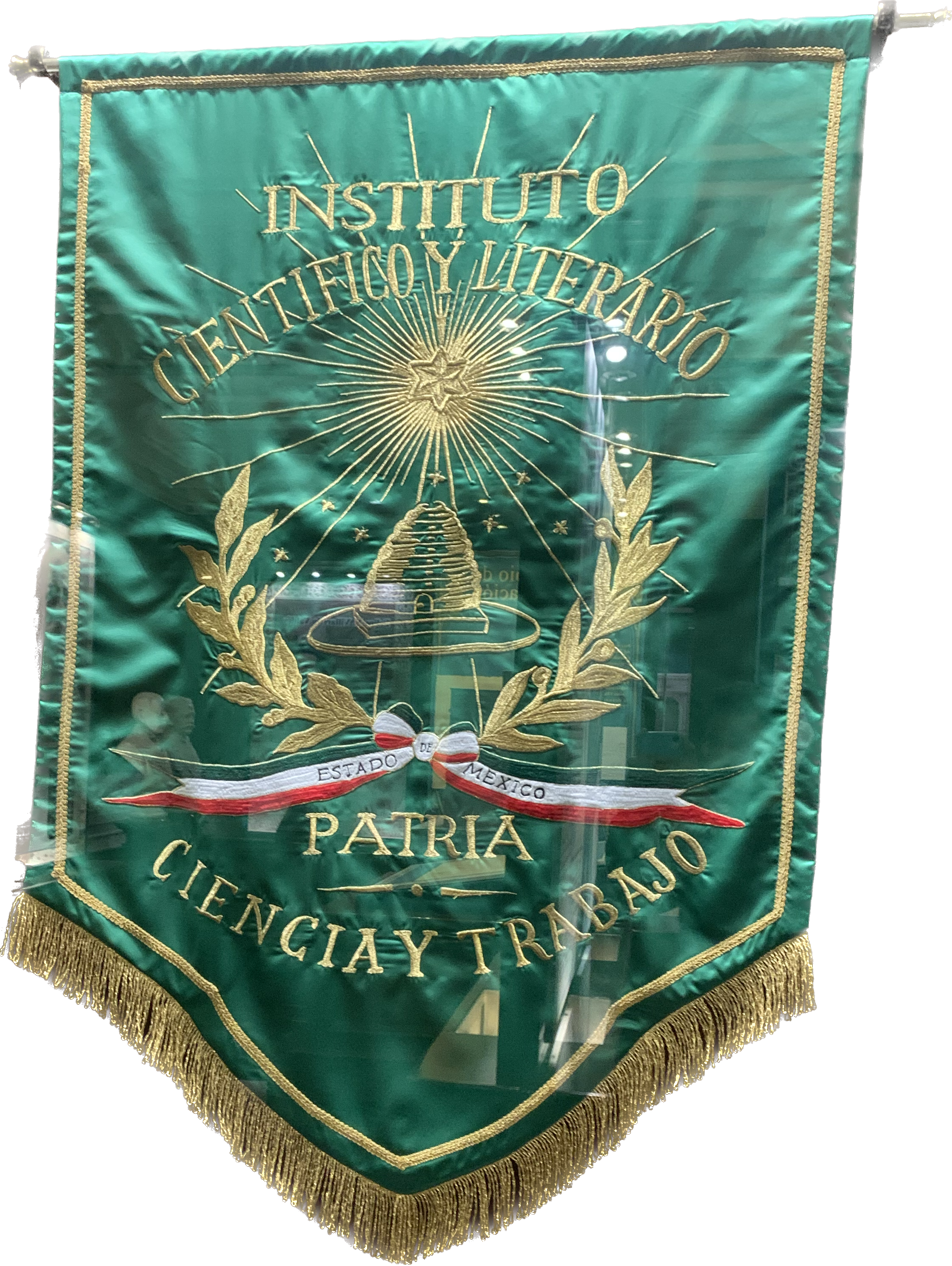
Banner of the Literary Institute of the State of Mexico

After the Reform War, Gabino Barreda, minister of Education during Benito Juárez's term, traveled to Europe, where he learned about who is considered the father of positivism: Auguste Comte. Upon his return, based on the scientific method, Barreda designed the curriculum of the Escuela Nacional Preparatoria, which removed all religion-related courses to privilege science. Subsequently, each state was requested through a letter to renew the curriculum of their institute, to conform to that of the ENP. Mariano Riva Palacio, governor of the State of Mexico, carried out the task.

It was during this period that institutes became self-aware and started forging their own identity. This was reflected in the creation of its banner on September 15, 1887, when governor José Zubieta gave students the first institutional banner, inspired by the motto "Homeland, Science and Labor". Dean Joaquin Ramos explained the icons on the coat of arms with the following words: "On a green field, representing hope, there is a crown made of olive and oak branches as a symbol of homeland. At the top, a star represents science. Finally, in the centre of the emblem, embroidered in gold thread, there is a beehive surrounded by a community of working bees as an expression of labor". These symbols, as well as the green and gold colors of this first banner, are part of the current institutional coat of arms.

Another element of identity born during this period is the façade of the rectory building. The removal of the chapel from the old beaterio, because of the separation of state and church, marks the end of the remodeling process of the building. This is how the premises became the seat of a completely liberal institution.

At the end of the nineteenth century, governor José Vicente Villada ordered a full remodeling of the Institute. He hired architect José Luis González Collazo for the design, and engineer Anselmo Camacho, a former mathematics professor at the institute, to build it. The latter made some modifications to the design that resulted in the façade of the Historic Rectory Building.

During the Porfiriato, the government period after Benito Juárez's term, the Institute stood out for participating at the Exposition Universelle held in Paris in 1889, where dissected animals from the collection of the Natural Sciences Cabinet were exhibited.

Typography, lithography, and carpentry workshops, among others, became part of the Escuela de Artes y Oficios [Arts and Crafts School]. At first, the Escuela Normal de Profesores [Teacher Training College] and the Anexa a la Normal [Annexed School to the Teacher Training College] were located at the Institute, but later moved to new premises. This is considered the golden era of the Institute since its professors laid its cultural foundations.

It was quite evident that students were different ages and came from various backgrounds. Boys wearing palm hats and indigenous garments coexisted with boys in suits and modern hats. Some of them used to live at the boarding school; others lived under the half-boarding regime, while the rest did not live at the school, but all of them spent time together in the premises. At that time, the spirit of rebellion lingered among students and professors. During the Mexican Revolution, the institution did not close doors. Its presence was portrayed on one of the faces of a peso banknote printed in 1915 in the State of Mexico.

Among other characters who studied at the Institute during the Revolution were Andrés Molina Enríquez, a great social scientist who fought the lack of progress and misery that Mexican peasants suffered; Pascual Morales Molina, part of the constitutionalist army and eventually governor of the State of Mexico, and Gustavo Baz Prada, who as a minor and medical student decided to join the Zapatistas. Baz Prada became governor of the state during the Revolution, a position he held again years later after being rector of the Universidad Nacional Autónoma de México. As a rector, he made internships compulsory for medical students, a measure that became extensive to the rest of degree programs.

In 1928, the Institute celebrated its one hundredth anniversary, but due to the lack of financial resources, high-school students had to make use of their creativity and celebrate in a soiree full of music and literature at the theatre of Toluca, where they recited poetry and performed some musical pieces. Likewise, a ball to crown the queen was held in the western courtyard of the Institute, which today is known as the Patio del Centenario [Centennial Courtyard] in honor of the 100th anniversary. Two icons of the university were created on the occasion of this celebration: the institutional anthem and the Monumento al maestro [Monument to Teachers].

The anthem was a creation of two professors: Horacio Zúñiga, who taught literature, and Felipe Mendoza, who taught music. On March 3, 1928, the foundation stone of the Monumento al maestro was laid, and five years later, with the support of students who organized various fundraising events, it was finished. The monument bears the words "youth and senectitude". The authors of the monument were sculptor Ignacio Asúnsolo and architect Vicente Mendiola, who were a student and a professor of the institute respectively.

At that time, the Institute did not provide higher education. This led students to join other institutions to obtain a higher degree, such as the Universidad Nacional, which became autonomous in 1929. After learning about this fact, many alumni from the institute came back to Toluca to pursue the Institute's autonomy. Becoming an autonomous institution was not an easy process, but a struggle that lasted about ten years. Some of the students that took part from the very beginning had become teachers by the end of it. There was José Yurrieta Valdés, dean of the UAEM for many years, Carlos Mercado Tovar, once rector of the UAEM, and Guillermo Molina Reyes, nephew to Andrés Molina Enríquez and son to Flor de María Reyes, the first woman teacher of the institute. Another important student figure during this transition was Ladislao S. Badillo, who was known as the leader or martyr of autonomy, as he died before the fight was over.

During this period, students' blood was shed and their freedom taken away. Many of them were imprisoned, even though police officers did not like to do so, since the prison was right in front of the Institute, where Grand Plaza Toluca is located now. In the case of teachers, the situation was different. Some of them were dismissed from their jobs, such as Josué Mirlo, while others, such as Horacio Zuniga, decided to abandon the Institute and not teach there again in support of the movement. Finally, on December 31, 1943, governor Isidro Fabela signed the decree that granted the long-awaited autonomy to the institution, which entered into force on January 15, 1944.

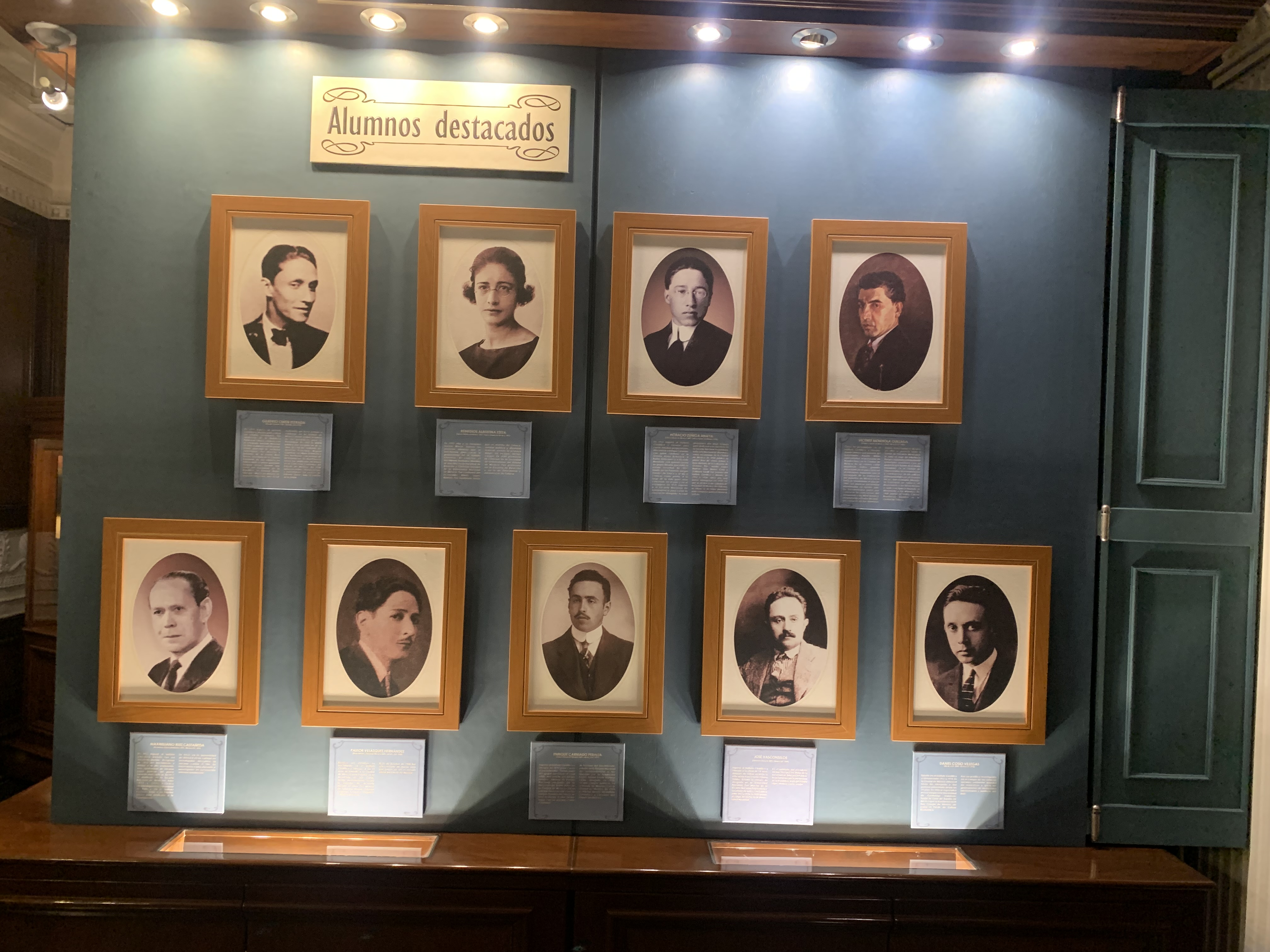
Portraits of the notable alumni at the Museo de Historia Universitaria José María Morelos y Pavón

=== Notable alumni and academics ===
- Ignacio Manuel Altamirano
- Andrés Molina Enríquez
- Gustavo Baz Prada
- Adolfo López Mateos, who not only became a teacher and dean of the Institute but also Mexico's president, a position from which he helped the Institute many times.
- Pastor Velázquez Hernández
- Gilberto Owen Estrada.
- Daniel Cosío Villegas, economist, law graduate and founder of the Fondo de Cultura Económica and the Casa España, which later became the Colegio de México. Thanks to Cosío Villegas, president Lázaro Cárdenas welcomed Spanish Civil War refugees into Mexico.
- José Vasconcelos, who came from Oaxaca; after having studied in Piedras Negras, Coahuila and Texas, Vasconcelos arrived in Toluca to complete primary education studies. It is said that he fondly remembered traditional candy from Toluca.

== See also ==
- Redalyc
