= Rodrigo P. Pimentel =

American businessman born in Germany

Rodrigo Pimentel is a political analyst, editorial writer and activist specializing in United States immigration policy. He is a "Dreamer", affected by the Deferred Action for Childhood Arrivals program (DACA).

== Personal life, education and career ==
Pimentel grew up in East Providence, Rhode Island after coming to the United States with his parents at ten months of age. Pimentel graduated from East Providence High School where he served as President of the Young Democrats club.

Pimentel is currently working for the Latino Policy Institute at Roger Williams University.

== Editorials ==
Pimentel has written editorials for several news agencies, most prominently Al-Jazeera, The Guardian and The Providence Journal.

Pimentel's commentary is usually regarding immigration policy and Dreamers and is often critical of the Trump Administration for ending DACA and Congress for its lack of action to protect Dreamers.

== Activism ==
=== Immigration policy ===
Pimentel's main policy focus is US immigration reform. Pimentel has rallied other Dreamers both in his native Rhode Island and in Washington, D.C. to push for a permanent fix for DACA recipients.

On a national level, Pimentel has been critical of the Trump Administration's positions on immigration and ending the DACA program. Pimentel has also been critical of congressional inaction on the issue of Dreamers. Pimentel has advocated for Dreamers both with his local congressional delegation and leaders in Washington D.C.

In Rhode Island, Pimentel has lobbied both the Governor of Rhode Island and the Rhode Island General Assembly for legislation granting undocumented immigrants driver's licenses. While Pimentel's efforts have been unsuccessful to-date, Rhode Island did pass a law to continue issuing driver's licenses and other protections offered under DACA to current recipients regardless of future federal policy. Due to his extensive work on the issue, he was asked to introduce Governor Gina Raimondo at the bill signing. Pimentel was also cited as one of Rhode Island's politically 'Hot' individuals by news site GoLocalProv.

=== Other issues ===
While attending East Providence High School, Pimentel advocated against high stakes standardized testing in schools, particularly the PARCC test in Rhode Island, encouraging parents to 'opt out' their students.

In late 2015, controversial 'dancing cop' Tony Lepore had been scheduled to perform during the holidays in East Providence, Rhode Island, Pimentel's home town. Lepore had been removed from his long standing job directing traffic in Providence, Rhode Island after a series of events leading to racial tensions in the city. Pimentel organized and led protests along with Black Lives Matter and other local civil rights figures which successfully forced Lepore to withdraw.
