= Rod Pimentel =

American politician

Member of New Hampshire House of Representatives for Merrimack 6
- In office December 5, 2018 – December 7, 2022
- Preceded by: David Woolpert
- Succeeded by: Tom Schamberg

Personal details
- Party: Democratic

Rod Pimentel is an American politician. He was a member of the New Hampshire House of Representatives and represented Merrimack's 6th district.
