= Eduardo Pimentel =

Eduardo Pimentel may refer to:

- Eduardo Pimentel (footballer) (born 1961), Colombian footballer
- Eduardo Pimentel (politician) (born 1984), Brazilian politician
