= Andrés Molina Enríquez =

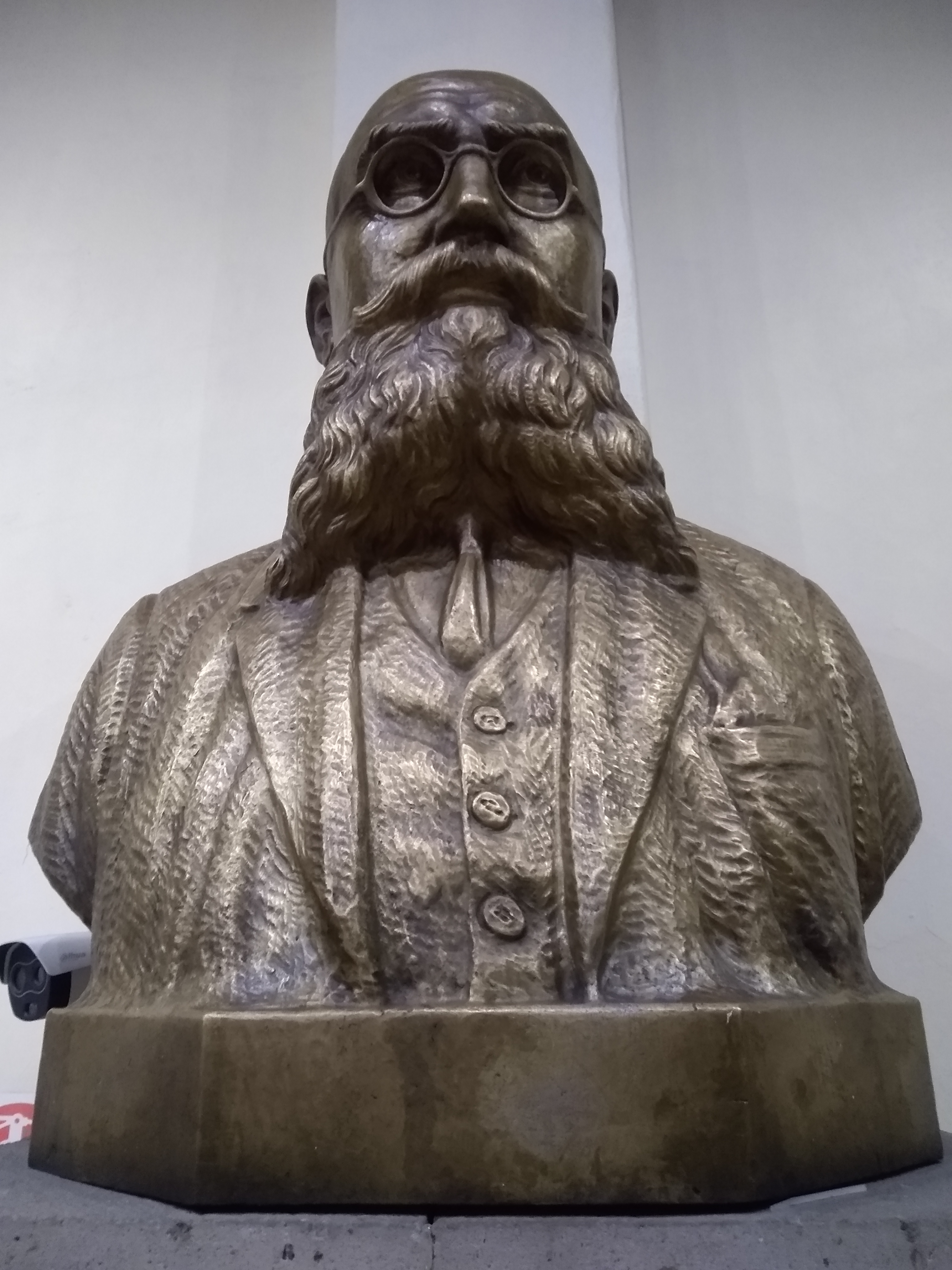
Bust of Andrés Molina Enríquez

Andrés Molina Enríquez (30 November 1868 – 1 August 1940) was a Mexican revolutionary intellectual, author of The Great National Problems (1909) which drew on his experiences as a notary and Justice of the Peace in the State of Mexico. He is considered the intellectual father of the land reform movement in modern Mexico embodied in Article 27 of the Constitution of 1917, and for reasserting the principle of national sovereignty with regard to ownership of land and resources on a liberal positivist basis. He has been called "the Rousseau of the Mexican Revolution".

== Life ==
He was born in Jilotepec, State of Mexico, in 1868. He studied in Toluca and at the National School of Jurisprudence in Mexico City. He ran for governor of the State of Mexico in 1911. He died in Toluca in 1940.

== Influence & work ==
=== Los Grandes Problemas Nacionales ===
Molina Enríquez is best known for publishing Los Grandes Problemas Nacionales ("The Great National Problems") in 1909, a book highly critical of the Porfirio Díaz government. Molina Enríquez characterized the period after 1821 as the era of national disintegration. The book highlighted issues of sharp political divisions, recurrent armed conflicts, and periodic foreign interventions. Molina Enríquez focused particularly on two aspects, land reform and the rights of the indigenous people and their place in society socially. Molina Enríquez was arrested by the government of Francisco León de la Barra on August 25, 1911, for publishing the document, which has later been described as highly influential on the eve of the Mexican Revolution. A well-known quote from the book is la hacienda no es negocio ["the hacienda is not a business"]: "By this he meant that the large Mexican landed states of his day (and stretching back to their origins in the era of the Spanish conquest) were for the most part not profit-oriented but 'feudal' enterprises, that rural Mexico was therefore only partially capitalistic, if at all, and that the country was ipso facto only imperfectly modern."

Certain prominent personalities within the Mexican liberal tradition such as Melchor Ocampo, Ignacio Ramírez, Ponciano Arriaga, José María del Castillo Velasco, and Isidoro Olvera had always had a "social" element to their liberalism inspired by French radicalism and utopian socialism, and this strand of thought influenced Molina Enríquez and other participants in the Mexican Revolution.

=== Indigenous rights ===
Molina Enríquez argued indigenous people suffered because of position on national social structure. In order to resolve the suffering of the indigenous people, and create equality, Molina Enríquez believed they had to be integrated into the national state, this idea would be central to the indigenist movement when it went international. Molina Enríquez has been cited as arguing that the only true Mexicans were the mestizos and that they would be the inheritors of Mexico, classifying the other social group in Mexico as Criollos, who were Spanish/French in their thinking and ways, the mestizos to Molina Enríquez, were a new race, with a new culture of their own and the majority of Mexicans. Molina Enríquez believed that the liberales mestizos were the group most capable of carrying out the modernization of the country. In La Reforma y Juárez (1906), he praised Benito Juárez and the Reform Era as a time of political virtues in contrast to the corruption of the Porfiriato.

=== Land reform ===
Molina Enríquez believed land reform was needed. In August 1911, he issued the Plan de Texcoco as a prelude to revolt, in which he called for establishing a dictatorship committed to land reform. A version of the Plan de Texcoco was published in the newspaper El Imparcial, which condensed the land reform section, with the Decree over the breaking up of large properties saying

It is declared that on the basis of public utility, from the date of this decree [August 23, 1911], the partial expropriation of all the rural estates with a surface area that exceeds two thousand hectares. Popular action may denounce the real estate that should be expropriated in keeping with this law. The denouncer has the right to choose the best part of the land suitable for expropriation.

The role of the dictatorship would be to parcel out large haciendas to individual, not communal claimants. Molina Enríquez would eventually go on to be a key adviser to the committee which drafted article 27 of the Mexican Constitution and a member of the National Agrarian Commission. Molina Enríquez had helped create the legal mandate for the destruction of the hacienda system and the re-centralization of State power.

== See also ==
- Constitutions of Mexico
- History of Mexico
- Land reform in Latin America
- Land reform in Mexico
- Politics of Mexico
