= David Woolpert =

American politician

Member of New Hampshire House of Representatives for Merrimack 6
- In office 2016–2018
- Succeeded by: Rod Pimentel

Personal details
- Party: Democratic

David Woolpert is an American politician. He was a member of the New Hampshire House of Representatives and represented Merrimack's 6th district.
