= Tony Lepore =

American police officer

Coordinates: 41.8235°N 71.4117°W

Tony Lepore (born October 17, 1947), popularly known as the Dancing Cop, is a retired American police officer who danced while directing traffic in Providence, Rhode Island during the December holiday season. Lepore has also done stage performances.

Lepore began dancing while directing traffic in 1984 as a way to relieve boredom. After he retired from the Providence Police Department, city leaders asked that him to return during the holiday season in 1992. He agreed to a contract to return as a reserve police officer and continued the practice in ensuing years

In 2015, Providence officials elected to terminate Lepore's contract. Lepore alleged that they fired him for organizing an anti-Black Lives Matter protest.

In 2019, Lepore announced his retirement and move to Florida.
