= Carlos Ometochtzin =

Aztec nobleman executed during the Mexican Inquisition (died 1539)

- Died: 1539
- Occupation: Member of the Acolhua nobility
- Known for: Resistance to Christian evangelization

Carlos Ometochtzin (Nahuatl for "Two Rabbit"; pronounced [oːmeˈtoːtʃ.tsin]) or Ahuachpitzactzin, or Chichimecatecatl ("Chichimec lord"), also known simply as Don Carlos of Texcoco, was a member of the Acolhua nobility in colonial Mexico. He was executed by an episcopal Inquisition, making him known to history for his resistance to Christian evangelization. The main source of information on Don Carlos is the record of his inquisition trial, published in 1910 by the Mexican archives.

He was accused by Christian indigenous, including his own family, of continuing to practice the pre-Hispanic religion and sexually harassing his female relatives as per pre-Hispanic laws. He pleaded guilty for the sex crimes, but maintained his innocence about the religious charges to the end. He was burnt at the stake on November 30, 1539, at the order of Bishop Don Juan de Zumárraga. The act was disapproved by Spanish authorities, who subsequently removed Zumárraga from his position and established in the laws that natives were excluded from inquisitorial jurisdiction. Despite his significance in popular culture, recent scholarship regards his trial as not related to religion, but of a family feud rooted in local politics and sexual mores.

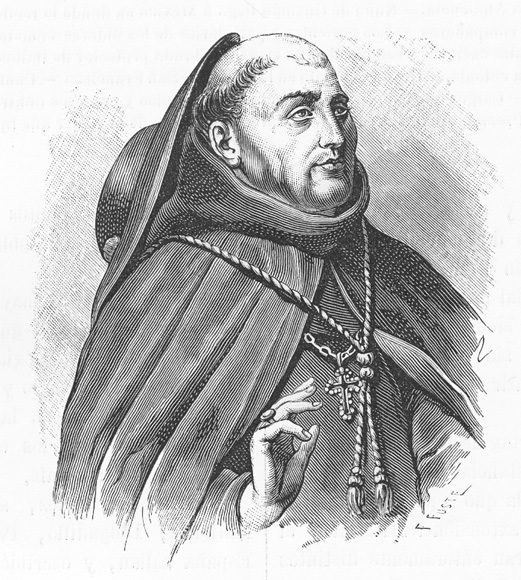
Juan de Zumárraga, the first archbishop of Mexico City, who investigated Don Carlos. There is no known image of Don Carlos himself.

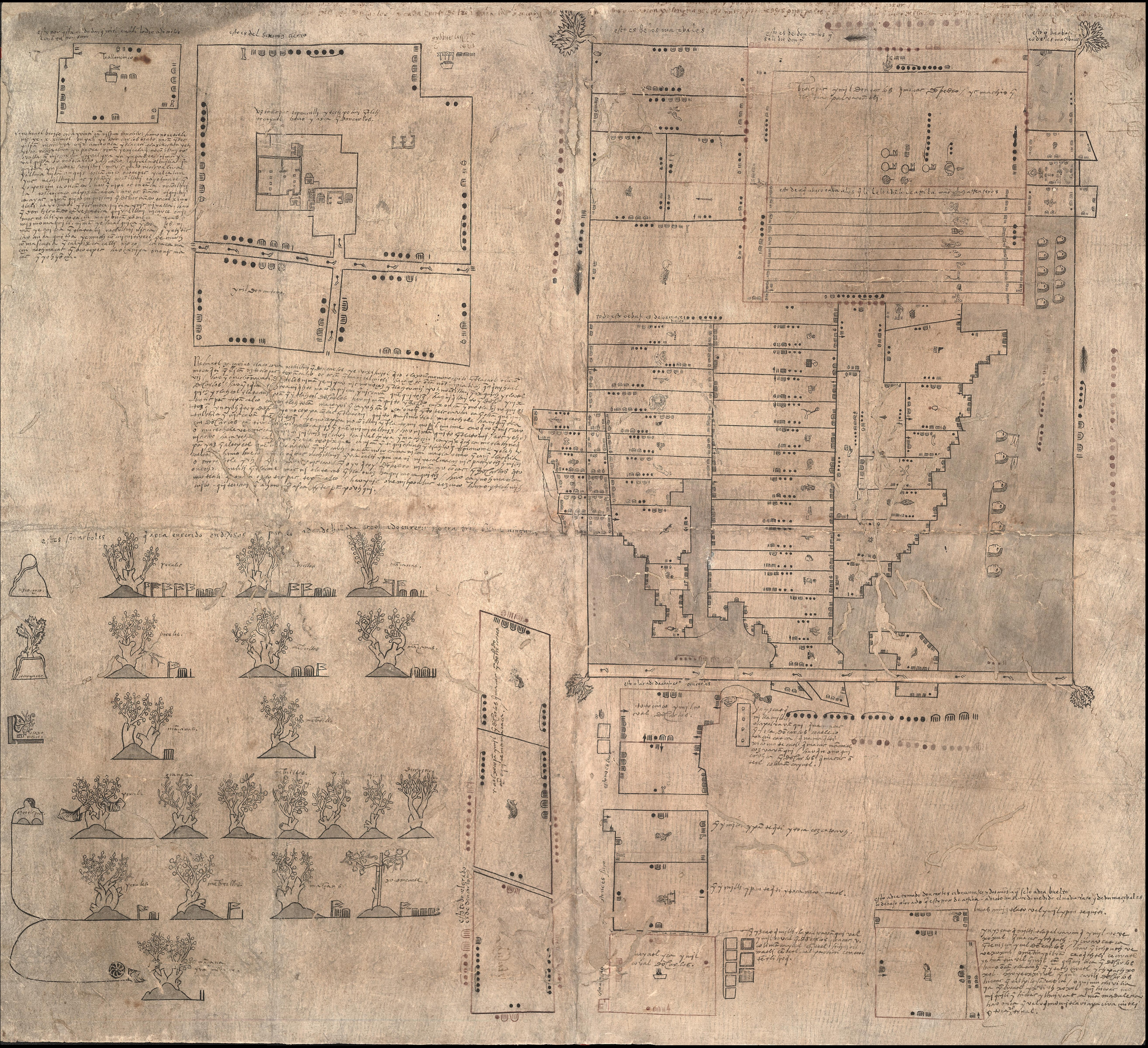
Oztoticpac Lands Map of Texcoco, part of a lawsuit to gain title to lands of Don Carlos after his execution

== Biography ==
Don Carlos was a grandson of the famous Texcocan ruler Nezahualcoyotl through his son Nezahualpilli. He held significant lands in the Texcoco region, depicted in the Aztec codex known as the Oztoticpac Lands Map of Texcoco, from ca. 1540 just after his execution.

Due to his lineage he aspired to become a tlatoani of Texcoco, although he never achieved his goal. Sources calling him a tlatoani trace probably to a mistake in the chronicle of Domingo Chimalpahin, who calls him Carlos Ahuachpitzactzin (possibly an entirely different person) and claims he ruled as tlatoani nine years before his execution, a timeline incompatible with most other lists of rulers of Texcoco. Ometochtzin himself never claimed the title of tlatoani in his living attestations.

He tried to convince the previous tlatoani, Don Pedro Tetlahuehuetzquititzin, to appoint him successor. He failed, with his brother Antonio Pimentel Tlahuitoltzin taking the place instead, so Ometochtzin tried to forcefully take his sister-in-law María, the widower of Tetlahuehuetzquititzin, as his concubine, which would strengthen his position according to their Pre-Hispanic laws. However, María rejected him and eventually accused him of sneaking into her house and trying to rape her, forcing her to sleep heavily guarded from then on. These acts earned Ometochtzin the enmity of most of his family, including his own wife, also baptized María, which turned decisive during his trial.

In 1539, don Carlos met trial for a set of charges under Zumárraga, the first Catholic bishop of New Spain. Two of his sisters accused him of trying to take María by force and of promoting pagan polygyny, while his wife María revealed he had maintained his own niece Inés as concubine and had fathered two children with them. The indigenous peoples of Santa María Chiconautla, who were ruled by one of his sisters and her husband, then accused him of idolatry. Ometochtzin admitted the concubinage and him sneaking into the house of his sister-in-law, but denied any heretical beliefs or idol worship. Don Carlos' attorney tried to call for new witnesses, but none appeared. On November 30, he was burned in the stake.

The case was ill received in the Spanish court, which had Zumárraga reassigned to a less prestigious post. The trial caused inquisitorial jurisdiction over the natives to be permanently revoked, on the basis that the indigenous were too recently converted to Christianity to be treated by the same standards and punishments as old Christians.
