= Antonio Pimentel Tlahuitoltzin =

Mexican politician

Antonio Pimentel Tlahuitoltzin was tlatoani (ruler) of Texcoco from 1540 to 1545.

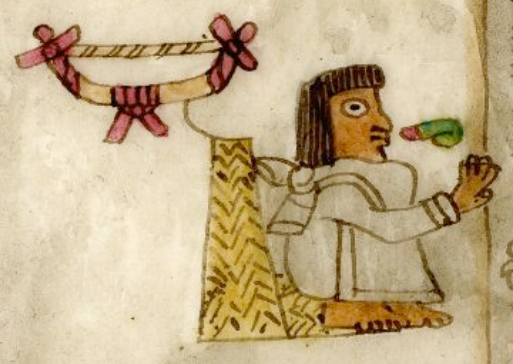
Depicted in a codex

His rule began in 1540 after the execution of his half brother and rival for the throne Carlos by the Spanish Inquisition. Unlike Carlos, Antonio was outwardly a Christian with a close relationship with the cleric Toribio de Benavente Motolinia. He successfully maintained his authority under the Spanish Empire adapting the pre-colonial state to the new situation. He died of disease five years into his reign and nominated Hernando as his successor.

Preceded by Pedro Tetlahuehuetzquititzin	Tlatoani of Texcoco; 1540–1546	Succeeded by Hernando Pimentel Ihuian
