= National Mall and Memorial Parks =

Administrative unit of the US National Park Service

- Location within the United States
- Location: Washington, D.C., United States
- Coordinates: 38°53′24″N 77°1′22″W
- Area: 6,546.92 acres (26.4944 km^{2}); 6,482.78 acres (26.23 km^{2}) federal, (includes National Capital Parks-East)
- Established: 1965
- Visitors: 29,721,005 (in 2013)
- Governing body: National Park Service

National Mall and Memorial Parks (formerly known as National Capital Parks-Central) is an administrative unit of the National Park Service (NPS) encompassing many national memorials and other areas in Washington, D.C. Federally owned and administered parks in the capital area date back to 1790, some of the oldest in the United States. In 1933, they were transferred to the control of the National Park Service. These parks were known as the National Capital Parks from their inception until 1965. The NPS now operates multiple park groupings in the D.C. area, including National Capital Parks-East, Rock Creek Park, President's Park, and George Washington Memorial Parkway. National Mall and Memorial Parks also provides technical assistance for the United States Navy Memorial.

== Parks, memorials and monuments ==
=== Official units administered ===
- Belmont-Paul Women's Equality National Monument
- Constitution Gardens
- Desert Shield and Desert Storm Memorial
- Ford's Theatre National Historic Site, including Petersen House
- Franklin Delano Roosevelt Memorial
- Korean War Veterans Memorial
- Lincoln Memorial
- Martin Luther King Jr. Memorial
- National Mall
- Pennsylvania Avenue National Historic Site
- Thomas Jefferson Memorial
- Vietnam Veterans Memorial
- Washington Monument
- National World War I Memorial
- National World War II Memorial

=== Other squares, circles, triangles, memorials, and parks ===
- African American Civil War Memorial
- Albert Einstein Memorial
- American Veterans Disabled for Life Memorial
- Andrew W. Mellon Memorial Fountain
- Benjamin Banneker Circle
- Benjamin Banneker Park
- Brevet Lt. General Winfield Scott Hancock statue
- Columbus Circle
- Columbus Fountain – Union Station Plaza
- Daniel Webster Memorial
- District of Columbia War Memorial
- Doctor John Witherspoon statue
- Dupont Circle
- East Potomac Park including Hains Point
- Burke Park
- Edward J. Kelly Park
- Edward R. Murrow Park
- Farragut Square
- Franklin Delano Roosevelt Memorial Stone
- Franklin Square
- Freedom Plaza
- George Mason Memorial
- Henry Wadsworth Longfellow Memorial
- Holodomor Ukrainian Holocaust Memorial
- James Monroe Park
- John Ericsson Memorial
- National Law Enforcement Officers Memorial
- Logan Circle
- Mahatma Gandhi Memorial
- McPherson Square
- Memorial to Japanese-American Patriotism in World War II
- Milian Park
- Nuns of the Battlefield (Civil War Nurses Memorial)
- Pan American Annex grounds – located between Constitution and Virginia Avenues, NW and 18th and 19th Streets, NW
- Pulaski Park
- Judiciary Square Plaza
- Old Post Office Tower
- Pershing Park
- Rawlins Park
- Rigo Walled Park
- Samuel Gompers Memorial
- Samuel Hahnemann Monument
- Scott Circle
- Seaton Park
- Sheridan Circle
- Temperance Fountain and statue
- Southwest Waterfront Park (Titanic Memorial)
- Tomáš Garrigue Masaryk
- Statues of the Liberators
  - Benito Juarez
  - Bernardo de Gálvez
  - Equestrian of Simón Bolívar
  - General Jose de San Martin Memorial
  - General José Gervasio Artigas
- Taras Shevchenko Memorial (Ukrainian Independence Park)
- Thomas Circle
- United States Navy Memorial
- Victims of Communism Memorial
- Vincent R. Sombrotto Memorial Park
- Walt Whitman Park
- Washington Circle
- West Potomac Park
