= Statue of Benito Juárez =

Statue of Benito Juárez may refer to:

- Statue of Benito Juárez (Chicago), Illinois, U.S., by Julian Martinez
- Statue of Benito Juárez, Cholula, Puebla, Mexico
- Statue of Benito Juárez (Fresno), California, United States
- Statue of Benito Juárez (New Orleans), Louisiana, United States
- Statue of Benito Juárez (New York City), New York, United States
- Statue of Benito Juárez (San Diego), California, United States
- Statue of Benito Juárez (Washington, D.C.), United States

== See also ==
- Bust of Benito Juárez, by Julian Martinez
