= Bust of Benito Juárez =

Pair of sculptures by Julian Martinez

Bust of Benito Juarez
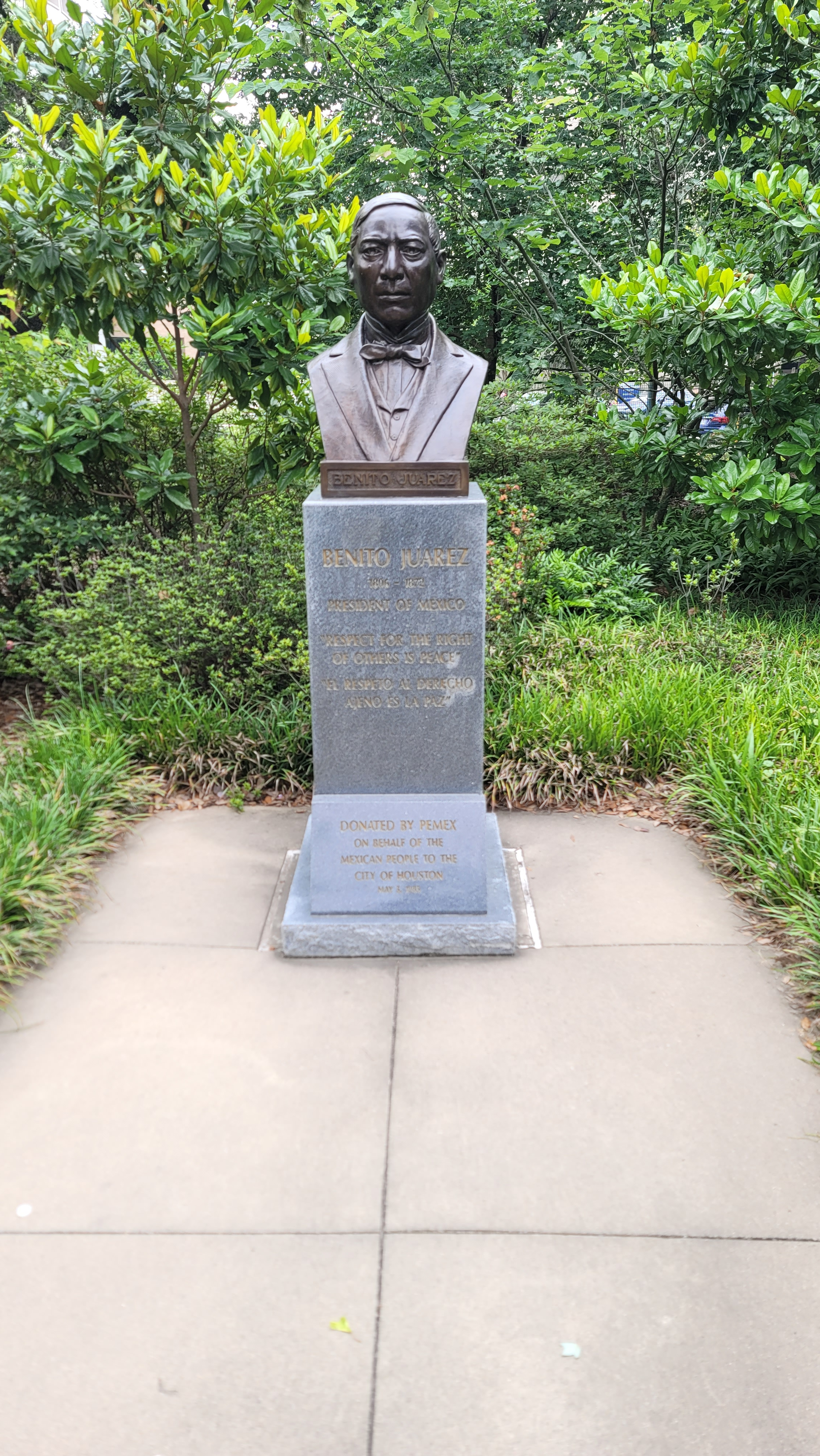
- Artist: Julian Martinez
- Type: Sculpture
- Subject: Benito Juárez
- Location: Houston; 29°43′20″N 95°23′17″W

A bronze bust of Mexican president Benito Juárez by Julian Martinez is installed in Hermann Park's McGovern Centennial Gardens, in Houston, Texas.

The sculpture was acquired by the City of Houston in 1985, having been donated by Pemex on behalf of the Mexican people.

== See also ==
- History of Mexican Americans in Houston
- List of public art in Houston
- Statue of Benito Juárez (New York City)
- Statue of Benito Juárez (San Diego)
- Statue of Benito Juárez (Washington, D.C.)
