= ARM Benito Juárez =

ARM Benito Juárez is the name of the following ships of the Mexican Navy, named for Benito Juárez

- ARM Benito Juárez (PO 142), a Sierra-class corvette, launched in 1998, suffered a fire in 2003, and sunk as target in 2007
- ARM Benito Juárez (POLA-101), lead Reformador-class frigate, in commission since 2020

== See also ==
- Benito Juárez (disambiguation)
