= Seaton Park (disambiguation) =

Seaton Park is a public park in Aberdeen, Scotland.

Seaton Park may also refer to:

- Seaton Park (Washington D.C.)
- Seaton Park Nature Reserve, in Durban, South Africa
- Seaton Park railway station, in Adelaide, Australia
