= Angel of Independence =

Victory column and statue in Mexico City

The Monument of Independence
- Monumento a la Independencia, Ángel de la Independencia (Spanish)
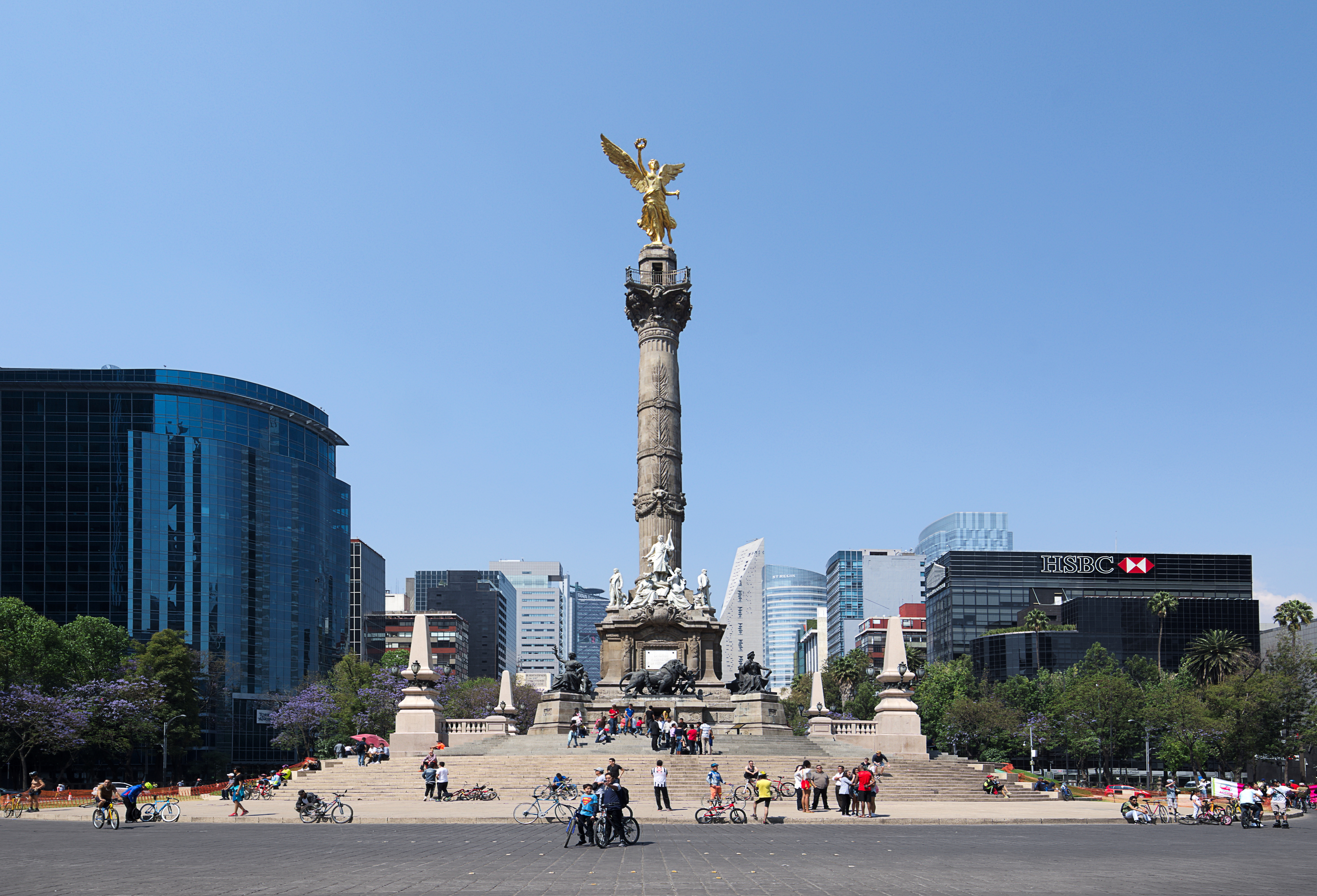
- Location in Mexico City
- 19°25′37.1994″N 99°10′03.7554″W
- Location: Mexico City, Mexico

History
- Inaugurated by: Porfirio Díaz
- Built: September 16, 1910
- Built for: Centenary of Mexican Independence

Site notes
- Elevation: 45 metres (148 ft)
- Architect(s): Antonio Rivas Mercado; Gonzalo Garita; Manuel Gorozpe; Enrique Alciati (sculptures)
- Architectural styles: Corinthian column Victory column
- Restored: September 16, 1958
- Restored by: José Fernández Urbina
- Governing body: Instituto Nacional de Antropología e Historia

The Angel of Independence, most commonly known by the shortened name El Ángel and officially known as Monumento a la Independencia ("Monument to Independence"), is a victory column on a roundabout on the major thoroughfare of Paseo de la Reforma in downtown Mexico City.

El Ángel was built in 1910 during the presidency of Porfirio Díaz by architect Antonio Rivas Mercado, to commemorate the centennial of the beginning of Mexico's War of Independence. In later years, it was made into a mausoleum for the most important heroes of that war. It is one of the most recognizable landmarks in Mexico City, and it has become a focal point for both celebration and protest. It resembles the Columbus Monument in New York City, the July Column in Paris, Nelson's Column in London, and the Victory Column in Berlin.

== Description ==
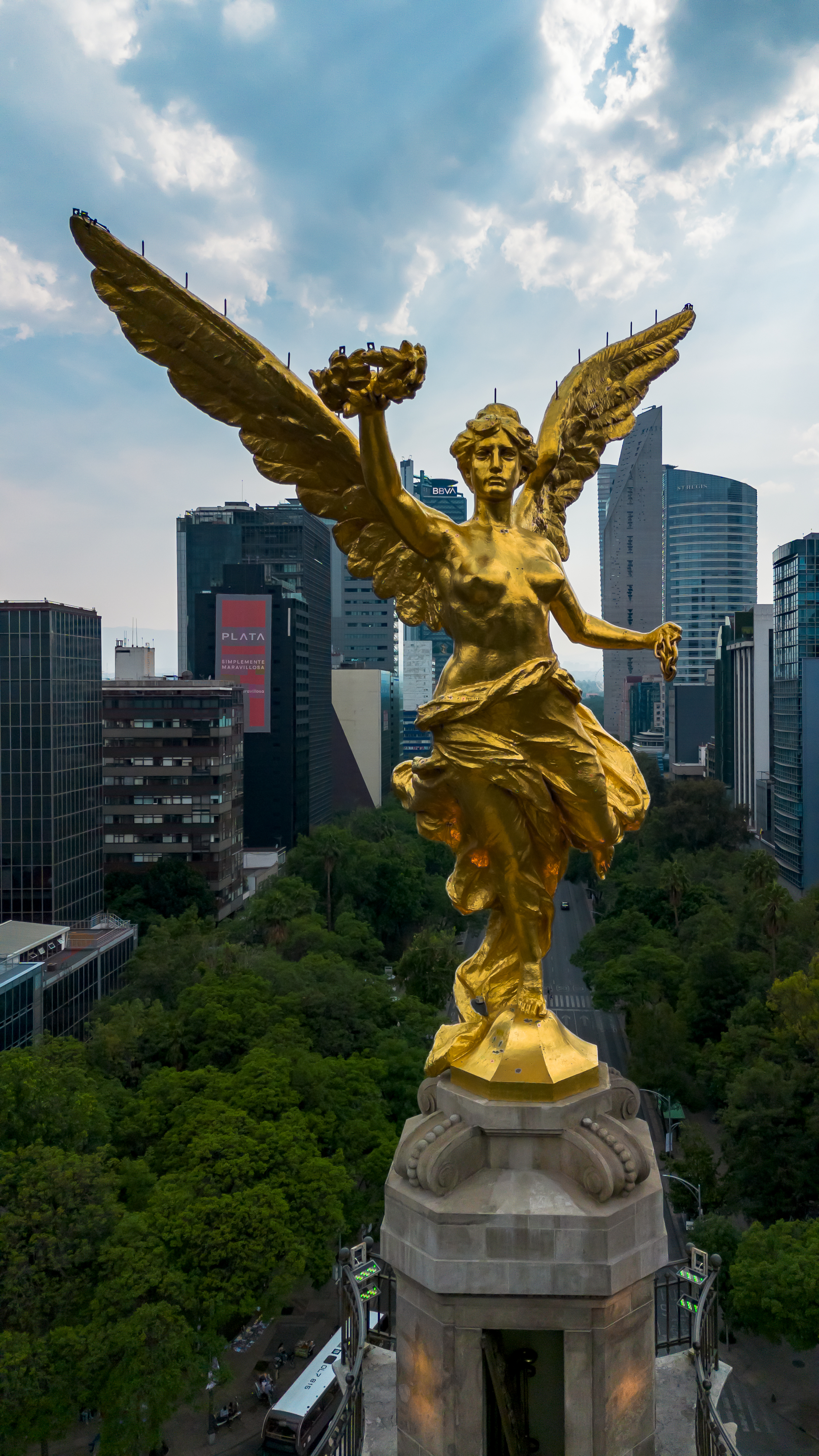
Nike on column top

The base of the column is quadrangular with each vertex featuring a bronze sculpture symbolizing law, war, justice, and peace. Originally, nine steps led to the base, but due to land subsidence, an ongoing problem in Mexico City, fourteen more steps have been added.

On the main face of the base facing downtown Mexico City, an inscription reads La Nación a los Héroes de la Independencia ("The Nation to the Heroes of Independence"). In front of this inscription is a bronze statue of a giant, laureled lion that guides a child, which symbolizes, according to Rivas Mercado, "the Mexican people, strong during war and docile during peace."

Next to the column is a group of marble statues of some of the heroes of the War of Independence. The column itself is 36 metres (118 ft) high. The structure is made of steel covered with quarried stone decorated with garlands, palms, and rings with the names of Independence figures. Inside the column is a two-hundred step staircase that leads to a viewpoint above the capital. The Corinthian-style capital is adorned by four eagles with extended wings from the Mexican coat of arms used at the time.

Crowning the column is a 6.7 metres (22 ft) statue by Enrique Alciati of Nike, the Greek goddess of Victory. Like other similar victory columns around the world, it is made of bronze covered with 24k gold (restored in 2006), and weighs seven tons. In her right hand the Angel, as it is commonly known, holds a laurel crown symbolically above both Miguel Hidalgo's head and the nation below, symbolizing Victory, while in her left she holds a broken chain with three links, symbolizing Freedom from three centuries of Spanish domain.

== History ==
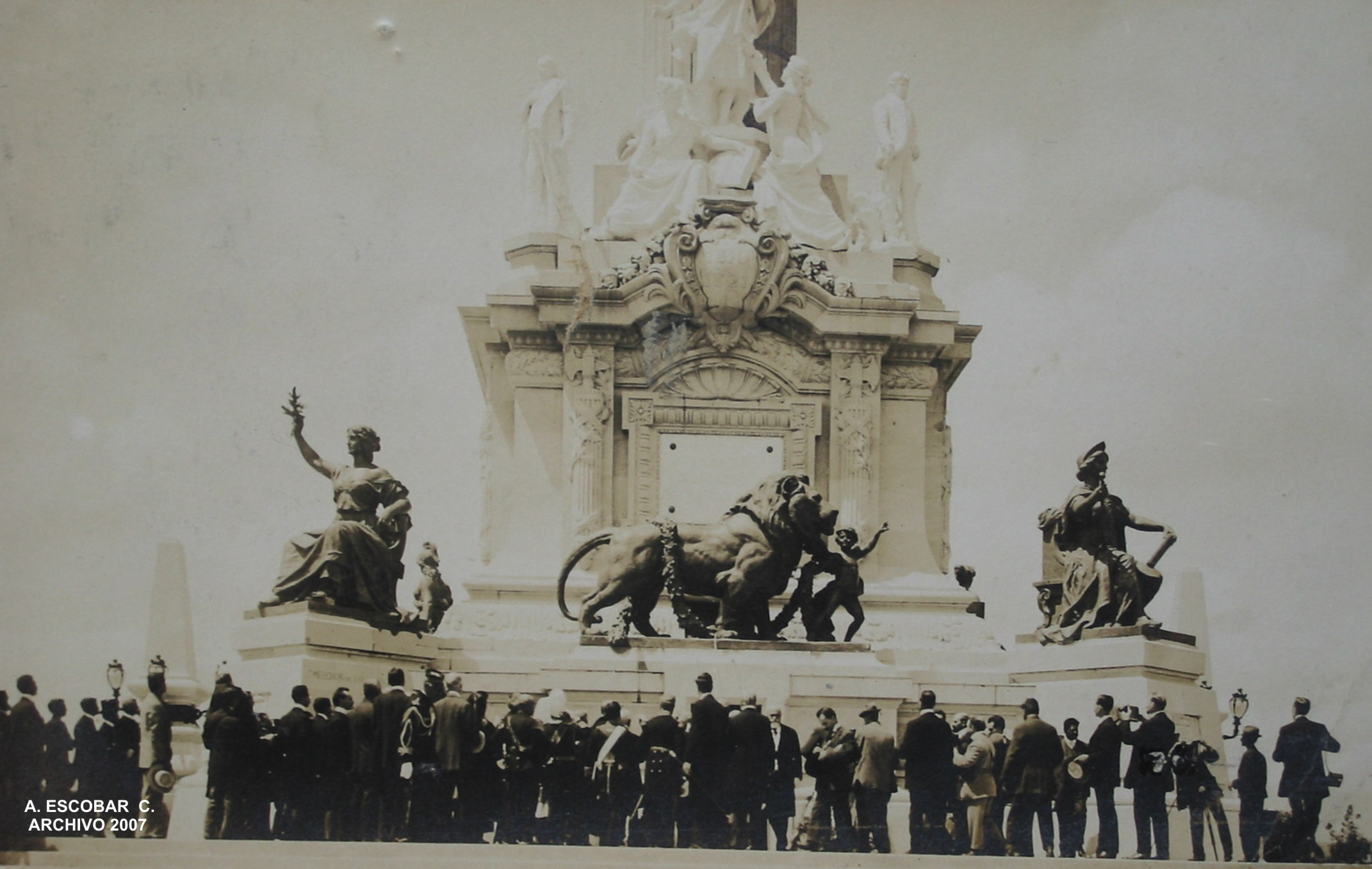
Inauguration of the Independence Monument, 1910

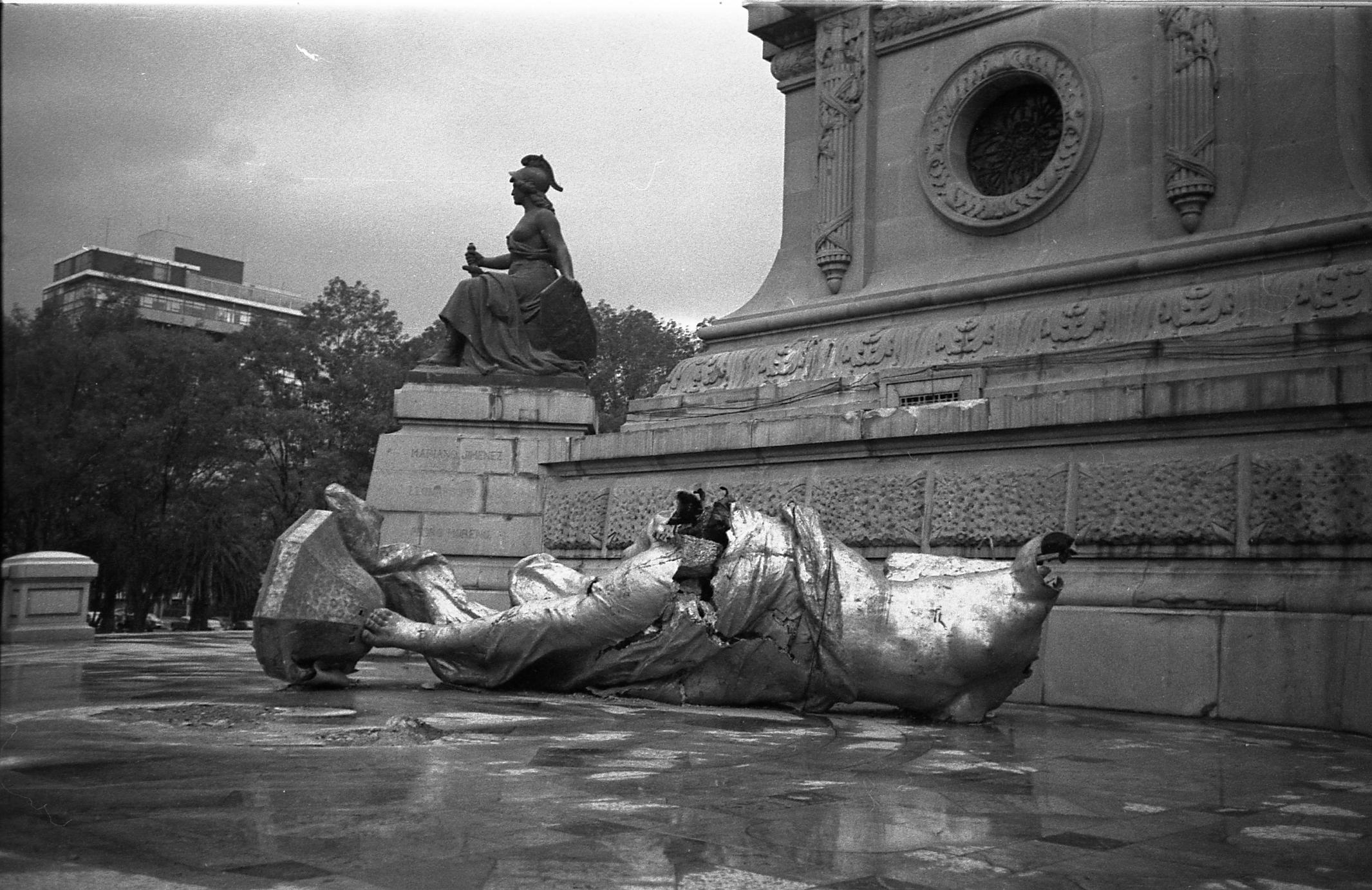
The sculpture of the monument, having fallen after the 1957 Mexico earthquake.

Construction of the column of independence topped by a depiction of winged victory was ordered in 1900 by President Porfirio Díaz. Antonio Rivas Mercado began to design the monument, envisioned as a column with both classical and modern elements, with bronze statues at its base. The foundation stone was laid on January 2, 1902.

Placed in it was a gold chest with a record of independence and a series of coins minted in that epoch. But in May 1906, when the foundations were built and 2,400 stones placed to a height of 25 m, the sides of the monument collapsed, so Díaz created a study commission composed of engineers Guillermo Beltrán y Puga, Manuel Marroquín y Rivera, and Gonzalo Garita. The commission determined that the foundations of the monument were poorly planned, so it was decided to demolish the structure. The work was restarted under the supervision of a steering committee composed of engineers Beltran y Puga, Marroquin y Rivera and the architect Manuel Gorozpe, leaving the artwork in the care of architect Antonio Rivas Mercado. All the sculptures were made by Italian artist Enrique Alciati.

The monument was completed in time for the festivities to commemorate the first hundred years of Mexican Independence in 1910. The inauguration was held on 16 September, the 100th anniversary of the Grito de Dolores (the battle cry by Father Miguel Hidalgo that was considered the initiation of Mexican independence). The ceremony was attended by President Díaz and many foreign dignitaries. Some 10,000 Mexican soldiers and contingents of foreign military forces helped mark the occasion. The main speaker at the event was Mexican poet Salvador Díaz Mirón.

An eternal flame (Lámpara Votiva) honoring these independence heroes was installed in the base of the column at the order of President Emilio Portes Gil in 1929.

The monument suffered some damage during an earthquake on July 28, 1957, when the sculpture of the Winged Victory fell to the ground and broke into several pieces. Sculptor José Fernández Urbina was in charge of the restoration, which lasted more than a year. The monument was reopened on September 16, 1958. It survived the devastating earthquake of September 19, 1985, with some damage to the staircases and the reliefs, but none to the Angel.

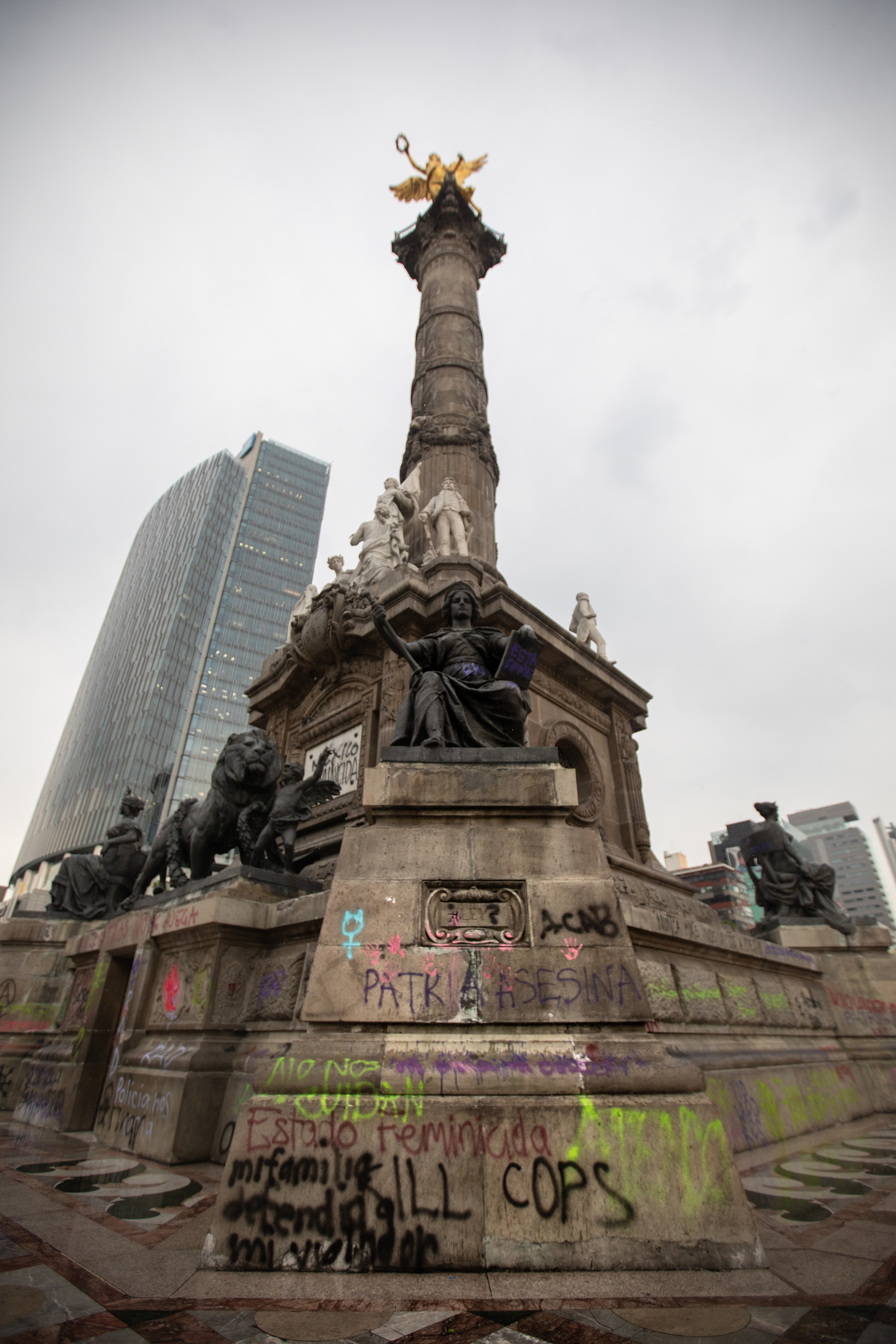
The monument after the August 2019 demonstrations

On August 16, 2019, following feminist demonstrations against gender-based violence and feminicides, the monument was affected due to acts of vandalism and graffiti. The Government of Mexico City closed access for an indefinite period, estimating a closure of one to two years. The restorations concluded in October 2021, and the monument was reopened.

== Mausoleum ==
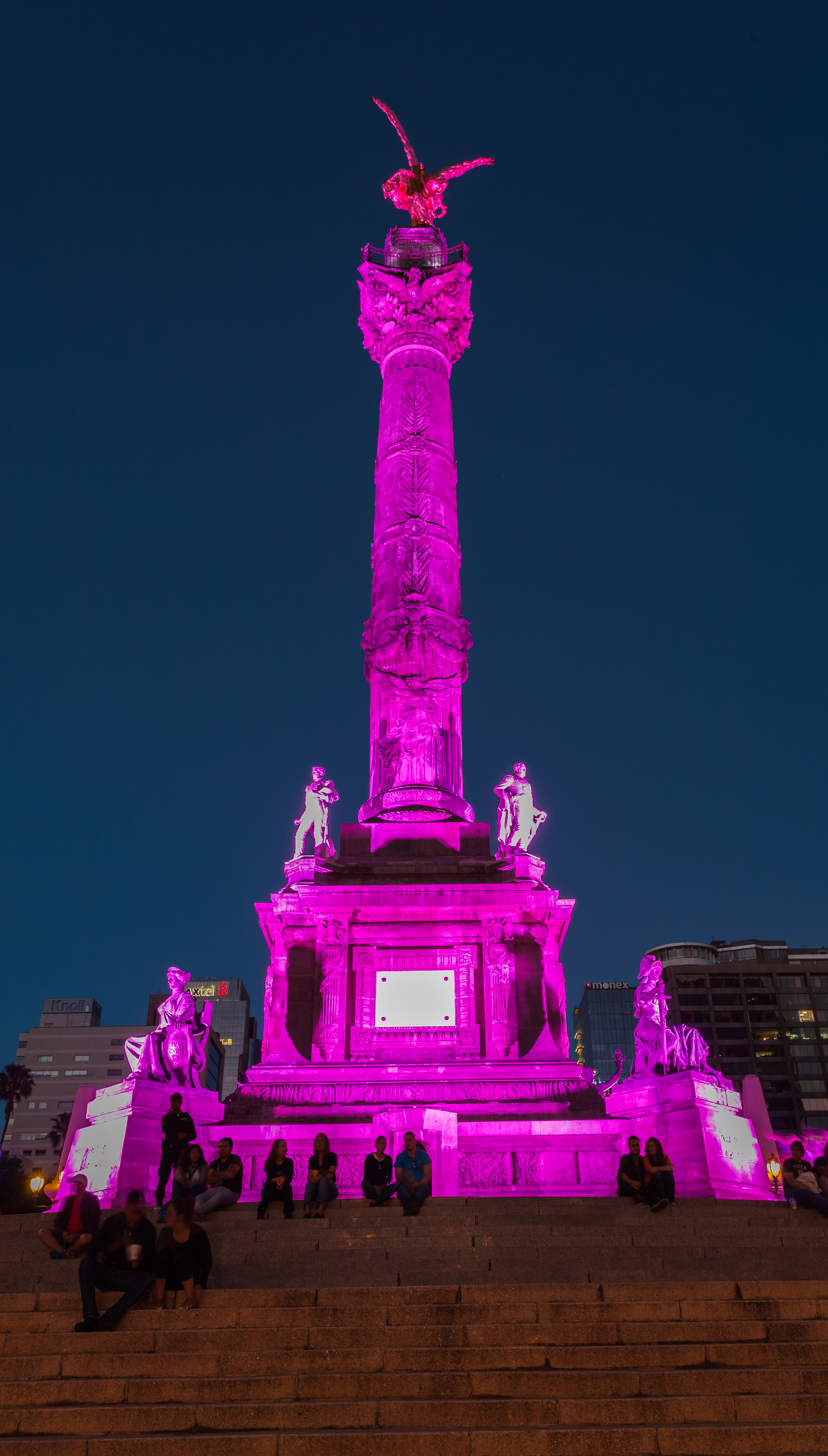
The monument lit at night with color changing LED light.

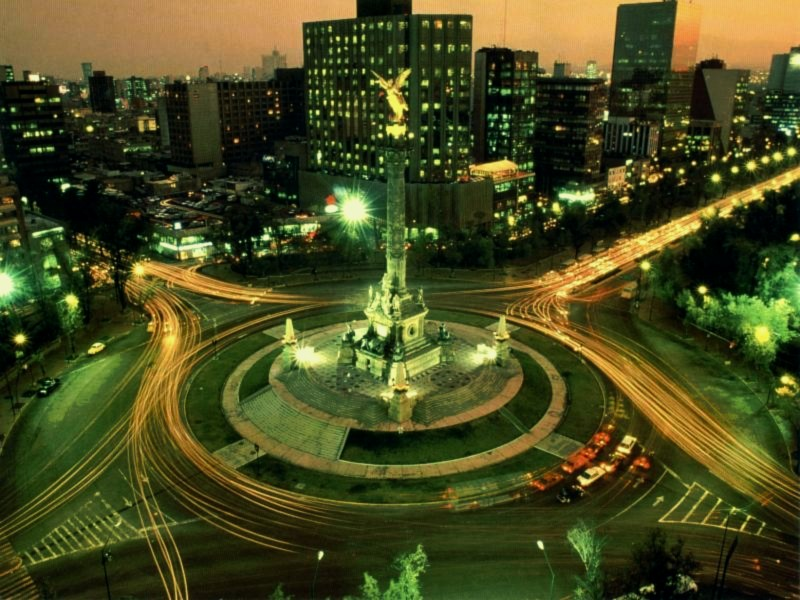
The Independence Angel on the Paseo de la Reforma, at sunset.

In 1925, during the administration of Plutarco Elías Calles, the remains of the following Heroes of the Mexican Independence were interred in a mausoleum under the base of the monument. At the entry to the mausoleum is a statue of William Lamport, also known as Don Guillén de Lampart y Guzmán, an Irishman who was tried by the Mexican Inquisition in the mid seventeenth century, following the discovery of his plot to achieve the independence of New Spain. He was released by the inquisition to secular authorities and executed in the auto de fe of 1659, with his remains forbidden burial in sacred ground.

The actual remains of insurgents are buried in the mausoleum:

- Father Miguel Hidalgo y Costilla: Chief instigator of independence in 1810 and "Father of the Nation".
- Father José María Morelos y Pavón: Skilled general and leader of the independence movement after Hidalgo's execution.
- Ignacio Allende: Lieutenant general of the insurgent army and later rebel leader.
- Juan Aldama: A rebel captain and conspirator.
- José Mariano Jiménez: Hidalgo's lieutenant colonel.
- Guadalupe Victoria: Commander of the insurgent army and first President of Mexico.
- Vicente Guerrero: Insurgent general following the death of Morelos and second President of Mexico.
- Nicolás Bravo: Commander of the rebel army and later President of Mexico on three occasions.
- Mariano Matamoros: A priest who served as Morelos's lieutenant general.
- Andrés Quintana Roo: A prominent constitutionalist.
- Leona Vicario: Active supporter of the rebel movement and wife of Andrés Quintana Roo.
- Francisco Javier Mina (Xavier Mina): A Spanish officer who joined the rebel cause against the absolute monarchy of Ferdinand VII.
- Pedro Moreno: Insurgente
- Víctor Rosales: Insurgente

Absent from the mausoleum is Agustín de Iturbide, who achieved Mexico's independence from Spain in 1821; his remains are in the Metropolitan Cathedral of Mexico City. President Calles excluded Iturbide when other insurgents' remains were transferred to the mausoleum in 1925.

More than 60 years after the mausoleum was erected, on September 16, 1998, it was permanently opened to the public by President Ernesto Zedillo and Cuauhtémoc Cárdenas, Head of Government of the Federal District.

On May 30, 2010, as part of the Bicentennial celebrations of the War of Independence, the remains of the National Heroes were exhumed and then escorted by the Armed Forces with full military honors to the National History Museum in Chapultepec Castle, where they were subject of studies by members of the National Institute of Anthropology and History. After these studies, the remains were temporarily exhibited at the National Palace until August 2011, when they were returned to the mausoleum.

== Visiting ==
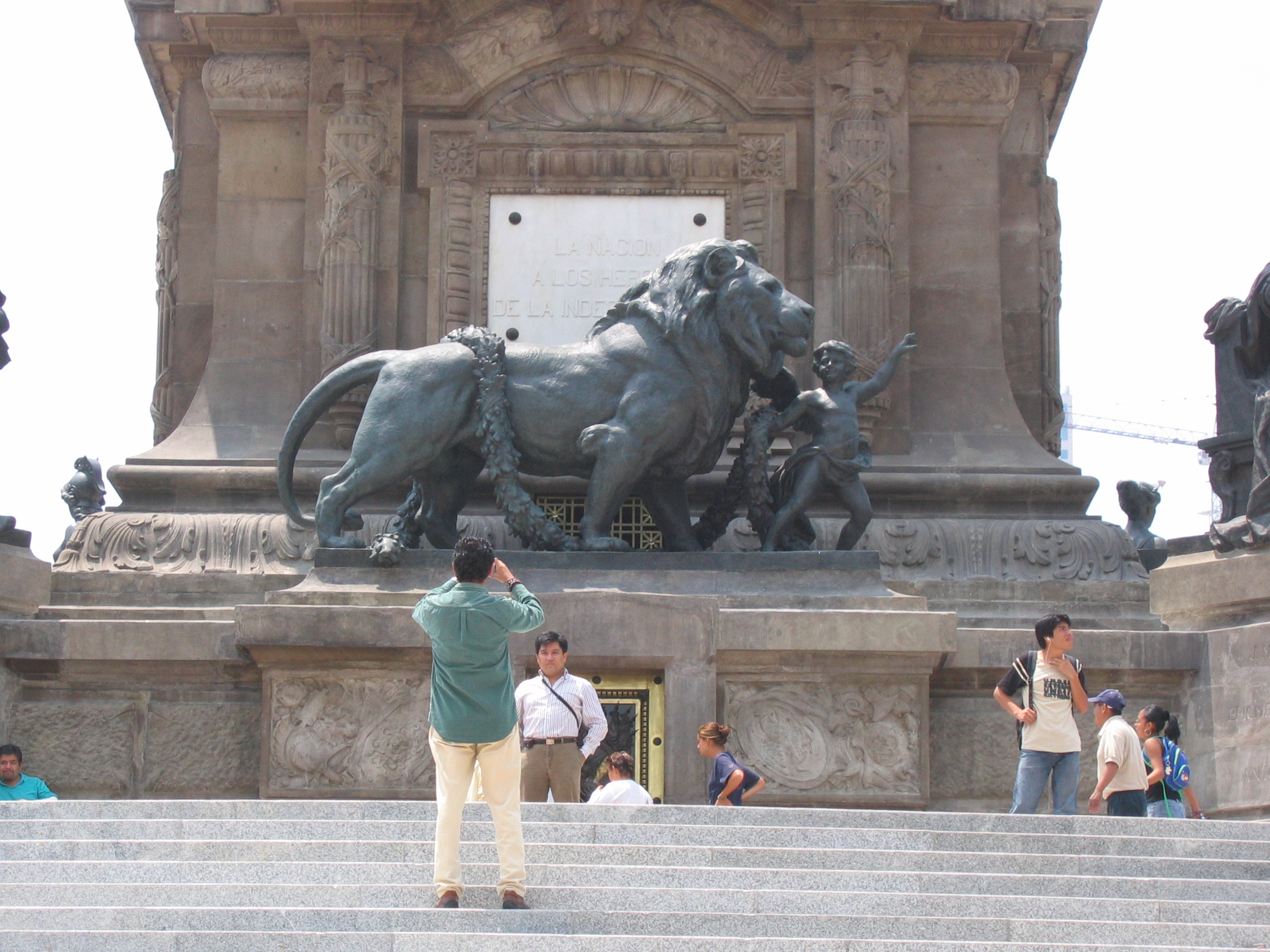
The Lion led by the Child

Visitors may enter the monument, view the memorial plaques at the base level, and climb to the top of the tower. While entry is free, visitors must obtain a permit at the Cuauhtémoc borough by showing an ID. Groups of no more than six people are permitted inside the monument for about 15 minutes. With about 200 steps, the climb is arduous. The first approximately 15 stairs, located in the monument the base, are wide and comfortable. The stairs in the column itself, approximately 185, are circular, metal, very narrow and without a landing or resting point until the top. Visitors who are not in good physical shape will find the climb exhausting—it is the equivalent of climbing a 14-story building in one go, and those not comfortable in tight spaces should avoid the climb as it has insufficient room to allow others to bypass. Some staircase areas are very dark, with only a few slits to let in light. The top balcony, though narrow, offers a commanding view of the wide avenues that surround the column. The return trip down is by way of the same circular staircase.

More recently El Ángel has become the traditional gathering place for celebration by Mexico City inhabitants, particularly following Mexico national football team victories and as a focal point for political rallies.

As of March 2016, visiting inside is limited to Saturdays and Sundays from 10:00 AM to 1:00 PM.

== See also ==
- Angel of Peace, Prinzregentenstrasse, Munich
- La Victoria del Viento
- Berlin Victory Column
- Independence Monument, Kyiv
- Mexican War of Independence
- Porfirio Díaz
- Porfiriato
