= La Victoria del Viento =

Coordinates: 20.0870°N 98.7713°W

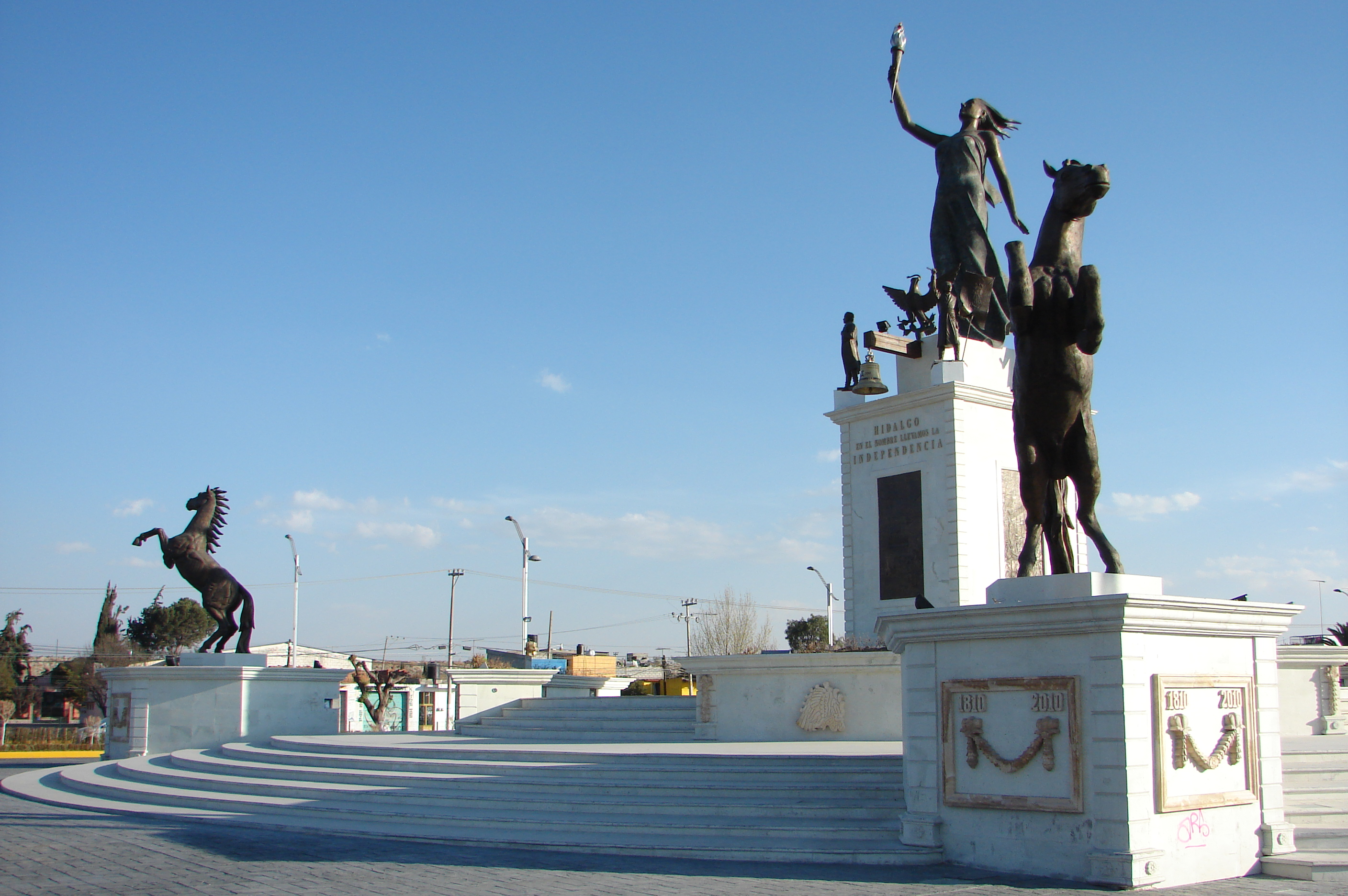
- Location: Pachuca, Mexico
- Designer: Bernardo Luis López Artasánchez
- Completion date: 2010
- Dismantled date: bicentenary of the Mexican independence

La Victoria del Viento (Spanish: The Wind-Ridden Victory) is a monument in the city of Pachuca, Mexico, commemorating the bicentenary of the Mexican independence from Spain (1810–2010). Located on the Bicentennial Plaza, the monument was created by Mexican sculptor Bernardo Luis López Artasánchez and consists of 14 individual sculptures.

The personification of Victory refers to the Mexican legend about a young, open-hearted woman, who fell in love with the wind and who sacrificed herself to the earth in return of welfare of the land. The Victory raises her right hand with the torch of freedom, while leaving the north wind play with her hair. The eagle with a snake on a cactus at the Victory's feet, which also appears on the coat of arms of Mexico, refers to the legendary founding of Tenochtitlan. The figures surrounding the Victory are Miguel Hidalgo, José María Morelos, Andrés Quintana Roo and Ignacio López Rayón. The horses symbolize those used at the battlefields during the Mexican war of independence. The Victory's pedestal bears the inscription "Hidalgo, en el nombre llevamos la independencia" (Spanish: "Hidalgo, in your name we convey independence").

== See also ==
- Angel of Independence
