= Rigo Walled Park =

Park in Washington, D.C., U.S.

- Location within Central Washington, D.C.
- Location: South of New York Ave. at L St., NW Washington, D.C.
- Coordinates: 38°54′14″N 77°01′07″W
- Area: 0.18 acres (0.073 ha)
- Operator: National Park Service, National Mall and Memorial Parks

Rigo Walled Park is a neighborhood-named urban open space located on National Park Service property south of New York Avenue at L Street, NW in the Mount Vernon Square neighborhood of Washington, D.C. It is administered as part of the National Mall and Memorial Parks.

== History ==
The land for Rigo Walled Park was a triangle formed by the original plan of Washington, D.C. Acquired as public property pursuant to the Residence Act of 1790 and later transferred to the National Park Service it has remained public property since the founding of the District.

== Facilities ==
Rigo Walled Park has no statues or monuments and no recreational facilities. It consists of a fenced-in landscaped space and pedestrian walkways.
