= Equestrian statue of Bernardo de Gálvez =

Statue in the United States

Coordinates: 38.895683°N 77.048533°W

Bernardo de Gálvez
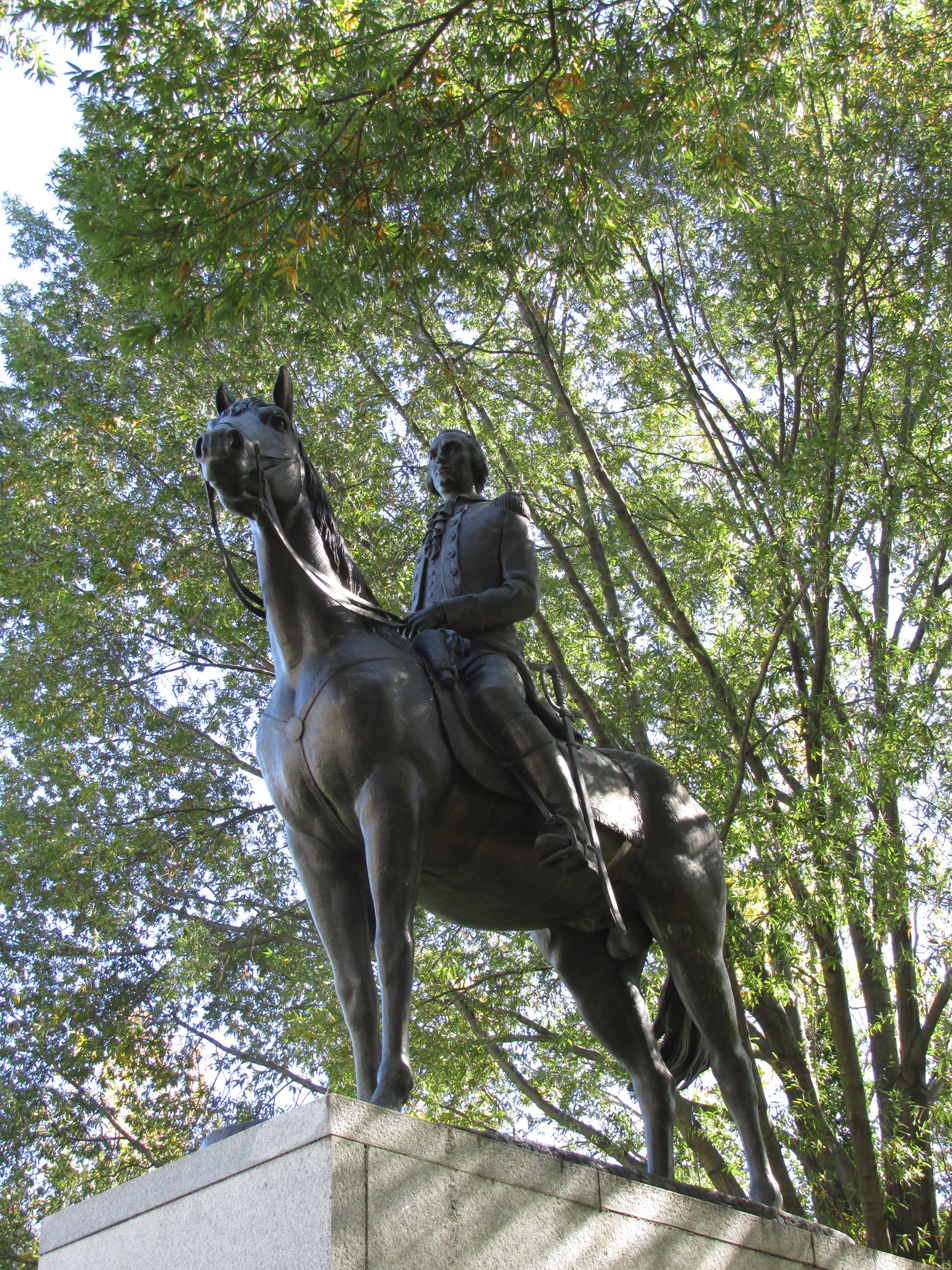
- Bernardo de Gálvez statue in 2014
- Artist: Juan de Ávalos
- Year: June 3, 1976
- Type: Sculpture: Bronze Base: Travertine or Granite
- Dimensions: 370 cm × 400 cm × 180 cm (144 in × 156 in × 72 in)
- Location: Washington, D.C.
- Owner: National Park Service

Bernardo de Gálvez is a bronze equestrian statue of Bernardo de Gálvez, 1st Viscount of Galveston, sculpted by Juan de Ávalos of Spain.

== Description and history ==
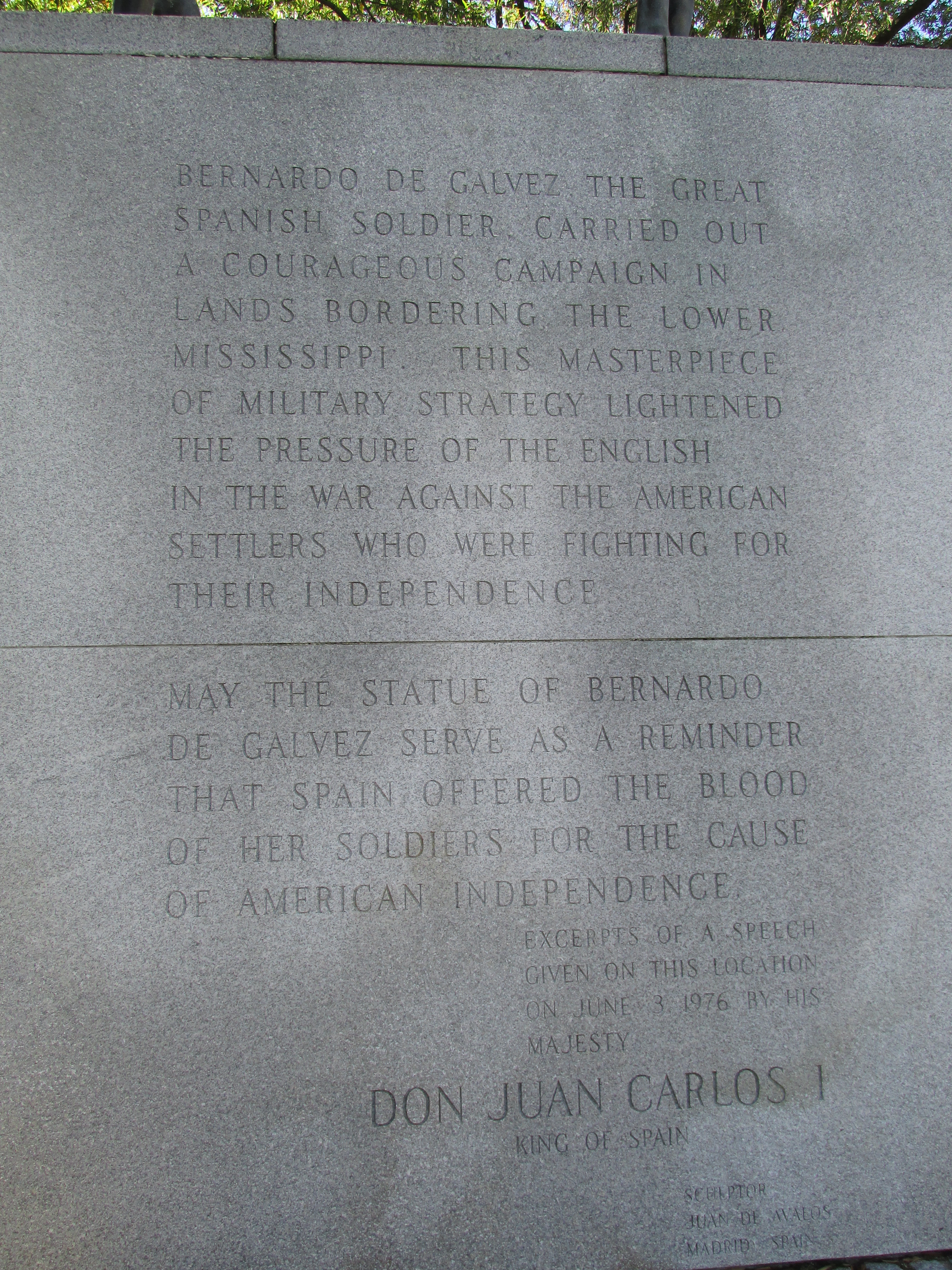
Text of the inscription

Located in the American national capital of Washington, D.C., it was dedicated on June 3, 1976, one month and a day before Independence Day of the Fourth of July, 1776. The statue was a gift from Spain to the United States upon the occasion of the U.S.A.'s Bicentennial (1776–1976) commemoration, 200 years later after the American Revolution and subsequent American Revolutionary War (1776–1783).

The Bernardo de Gálvez sculpture is located along with the Statues of the Liberators, at Virginia Avenue and 22nd Street, N.W., near the United States Department of State building in the Foggy Bottom neighborhood in Washington, D.C. It was dedicated by King Juan Carlos I of the Kingdom of Spain

The inscription on the base reads:

(Front:)
BERNARDO DE GALVEZ
(COUNT DE GALVEZ)
1746–1786

(Side:)
BERNARDO DE GALVEZ THE GREAT
SPANISH SOLDIER CARRIED OUT
A COURAGEOUS CAMPAIGN IN
LANDS BORDERING THE LOWER
MISSISSIPPI. THIS MASTERPIECE
OF MILITARY STRATEGY LIGHTENED
THE PRESSURE OF THE ENGLISH
IN THE WAR AGAINST THE AMERICAN
SETTLERS WHO WERE FIGHTING FOR
THEIR INDEPENDENCE.
MAY THE STATUE OF BERNARDO
DE GALVEZ SERVE AS A REMINDER
THAT SPAIN OFFERED THE BLOOD
OF HER SOLDIERS FOR THE CAUSE
OF AMERICAN INDEPENDENCE.
Excerpts of a speech
given on this location
on June 3, 1976 by
His Majesty
DON JUAN CARLOS I
King of Spain

Sculptor
Juan de Ávalos
Madrid, Spain

== See also ==
- List of public art in Washington, D.C., Ward 2
- Statues of the Liberators
