= Statue of Benito Juárez (Chicago) =

Statue in Chicago, Illinois, U.S.

Statue of Benito Juarez
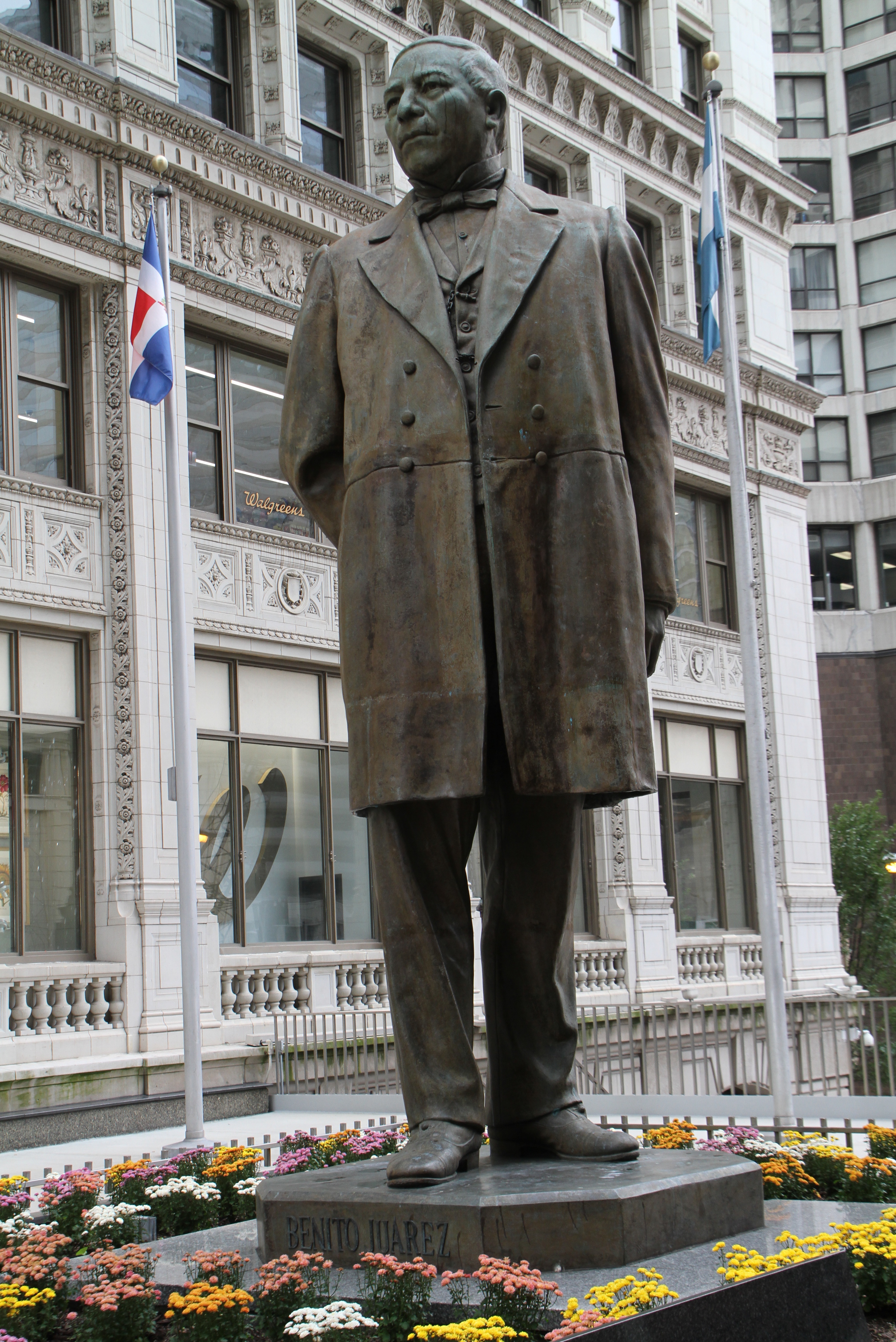
- The statue in Chicago in 2014
- Artist: Julian Martinez
- Type: Sculpture
- Medium: Bronze
- Subject: Benito Juárez
- Location: Chicago; 41°53′24.4″N 87°37′29.6″W

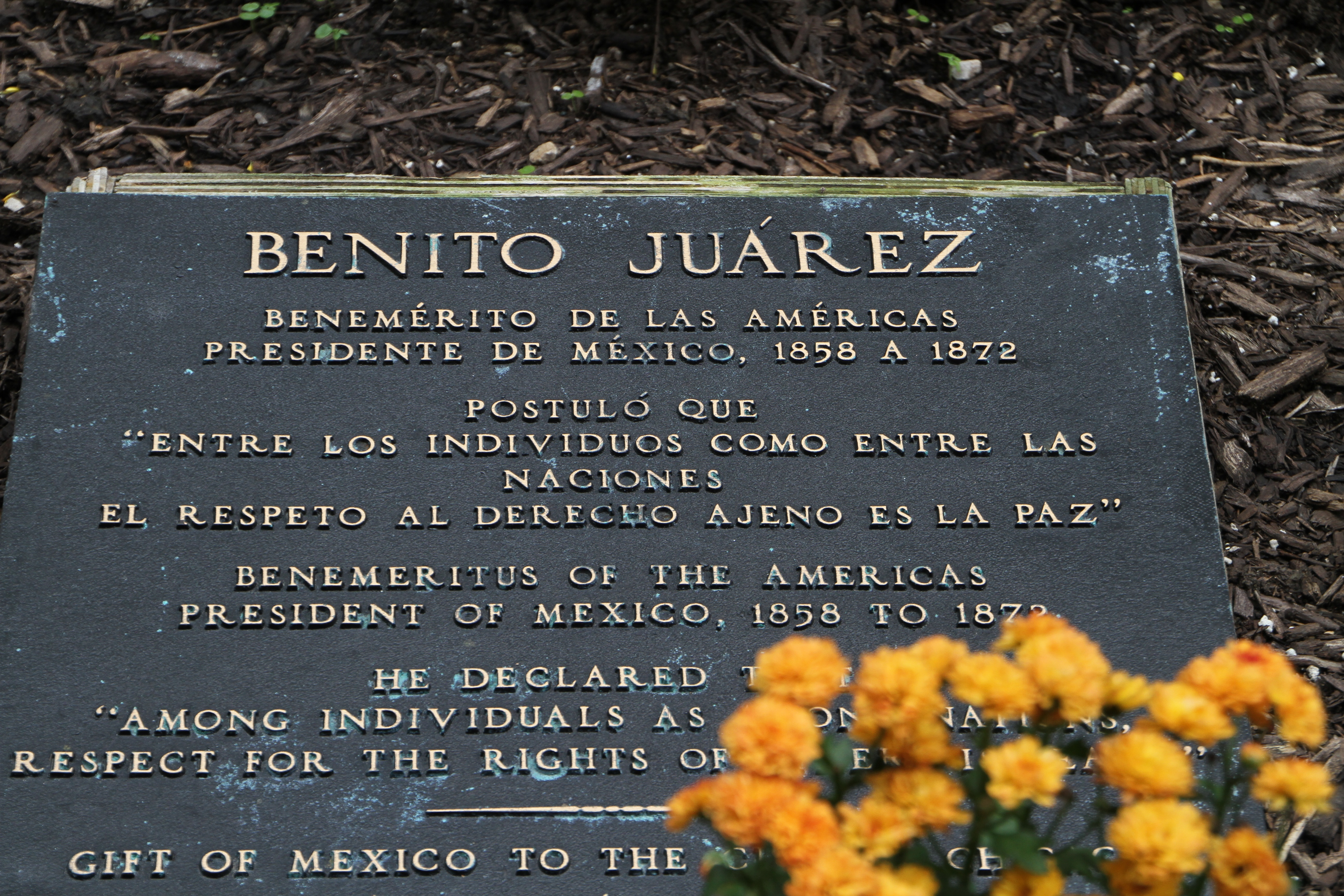
Plaque for the Chicago statue, 2014

A 16-foot statue of Benito Juárez, the president of Mexico from 1858 to 1872, is installed in the Plaza of the Americas along Michigan Avenue, just north of the Wrigley Building in Illinois. It was donated to the city by the Consulate-General of Mexico in February 1999, replacing a bust gifted by president José López Portillo in 1977.

== See also ==
- Statue of Benito Juárez (New York City)
- Statue of Benito Juárez (San Diego)
- Statue of Benito Juárez (Washington, D.C.)
