= Plaza of the Americas (Chicago) =

Public space in Chicago, Illinois, U.S.

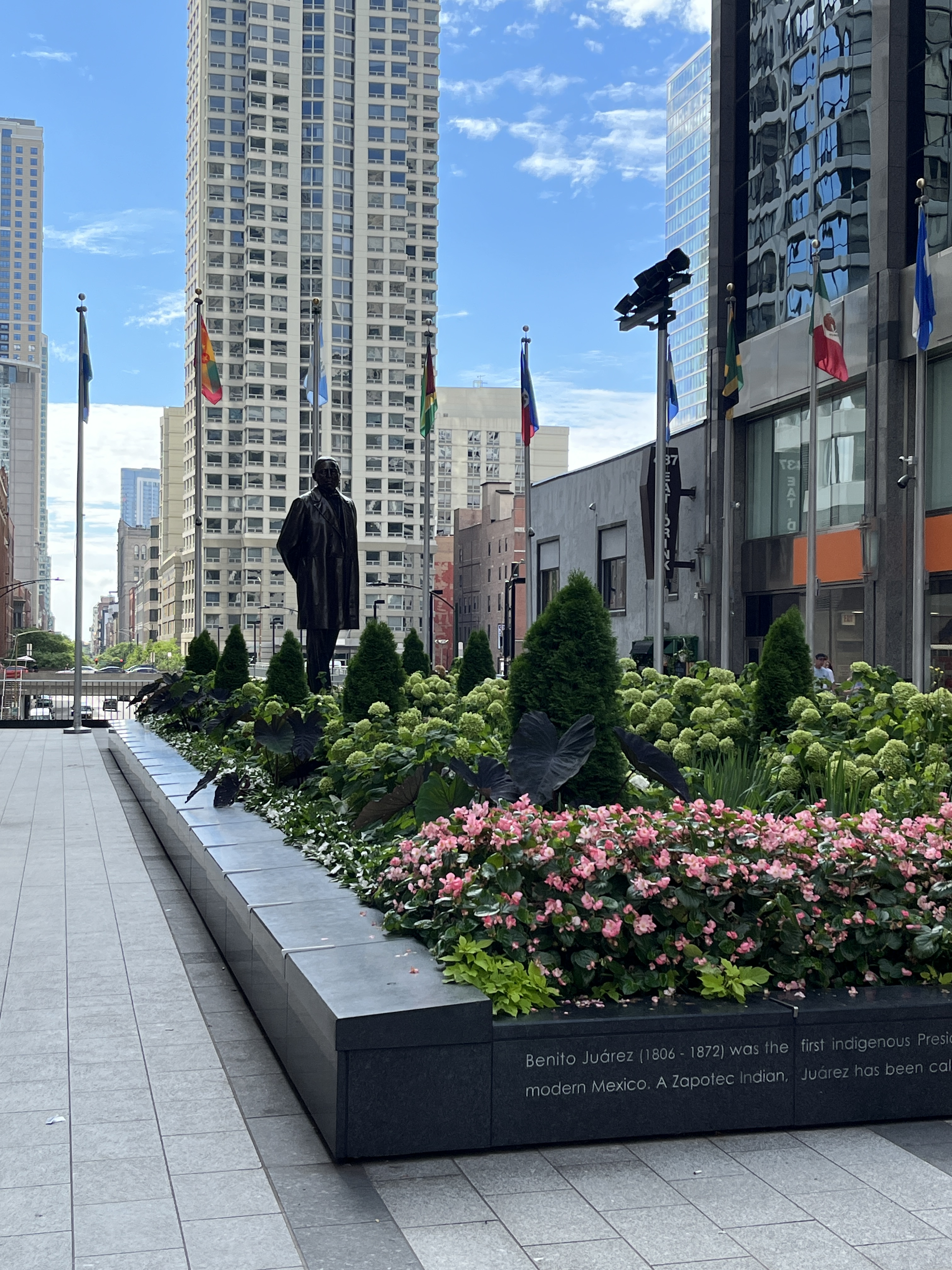
- The plaza's statue of Benito Juárez, 2023
- Location: Chicago, Illinois, U.S.
- Location within Chicago metropolitan area
- Coordinates: 41°53′24.5″N 87°37′29″W

Plaza of the Americas is a public space in Chicago, in the U.S. state of Illinois. Located between the Realtor and Wrigley buildings, the plaza was dedicated by the Mexican consulate general in 1963.

The plaza features a statue of Benito Juárez, a fountain, and flags of the nations in the Organization of American States. Jorge Marín's Wings of Mexico was installed in the plaza temporarily in 2022.
