= Statue of José Gervasio Artigas (Washington, D.C.) =

Bronze statue by Juan Manuel Blanes

General José Gervasio Artigas
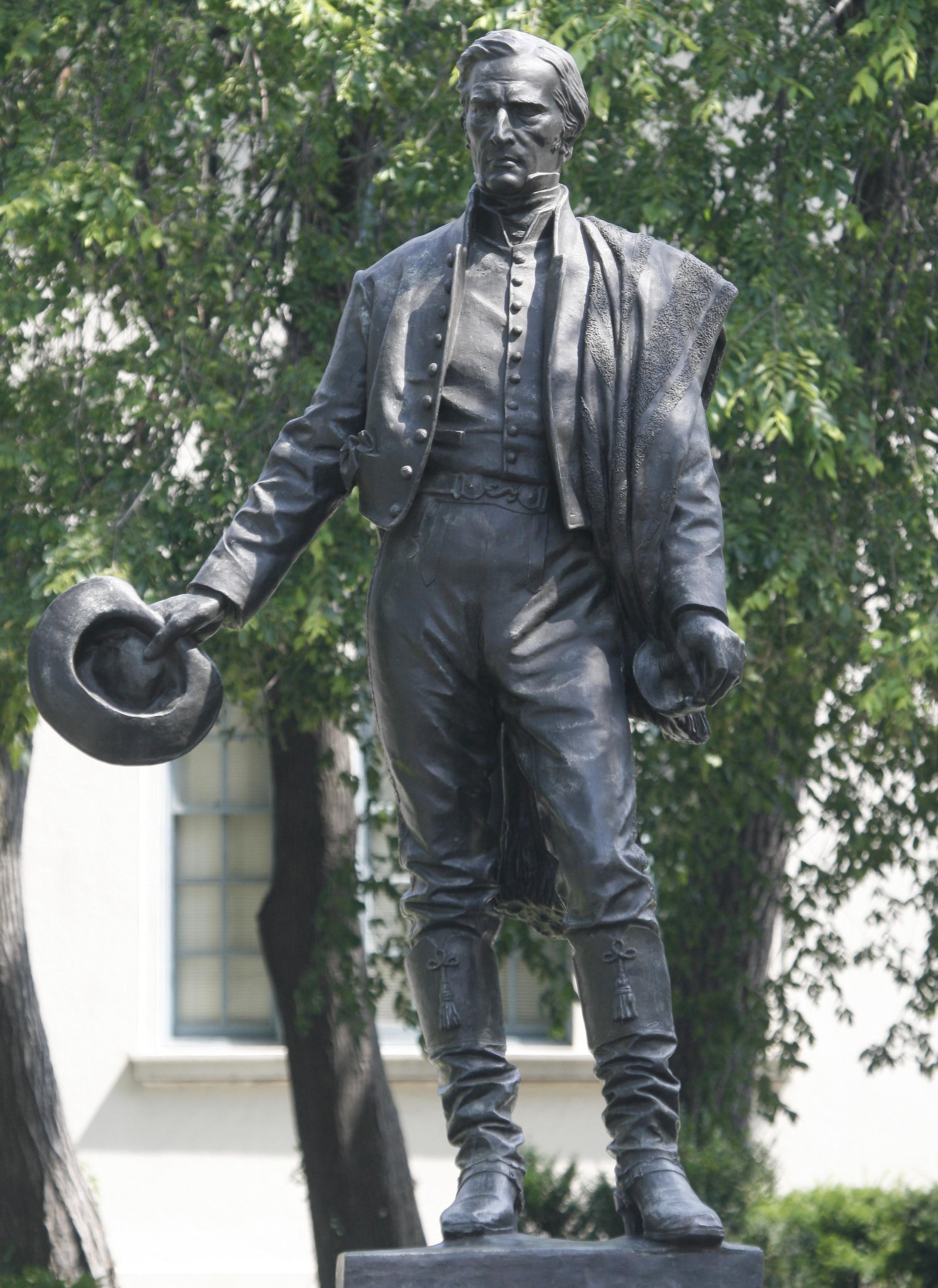
- Artist: Juan Manuel Blanes
- Year: 1948
- Medium: Bronze
- Subject: José Gervasio Artigas
- Location: Washington, DC; 38.8923°N 77.0415°W

General Jose Gervasio Artigas is a bronze statue in Washington, D.C., United States, at the intersection of Constitution Avenue and Virginia Avenue, at 18th Street. It is one of a set called the Statues of the Liberators. José Gervasio Artigas was a 19th-century general, sometimes called "the father of Uruguayan independence", "Protector de los Pueblos Libres" or "Jefe de los Orientales".

The Washington, D.C. statue was created before 1948 by Juan Manuel Blanes. At its base are engraved the words "Liberty of America is my dream and its attainment my only hope."

Although this statue was delivered before the identical one in Montevideo, Minnesota, Montevideo erected theirs in 1949 and the D.C. Parks Department did not erect its until a year later on June 19, 1950.

Both statues were gifts from the people of Uruguay and are replicas of an original in San José de Mayo, Uruguay, created by Italian sculptor Dante Costa. The Uruguayan officer Edgardo Ubaldo Genta had conceived the idea in 1940 as a good-will gesture.

== See also ==
- Artigas Mausoleum
- List of public art in Washington, D.C., Ward 2
- Statues of the Liberators
