= Benito Juárez (disambiguation) =

Benito Juárez (1806–1872) was a Mexican politician and lawyer who served 5 terms as president, notable for having defeated Maximilian I of Mexico and thwarting French rule.

Benito Juárez may also refer to:

== Mexico ==
- Benito Juárez, Mexico City
- Benito Juárez Municipality, Guerrero
- Benito Juárez Municipality, Quintana Roo
- Benito Juárez Municipality, Sonora
- Benito Juárez, Veracruz
- Benito Juárez International Airport, Mexico City
- Benito Juárez Autonomous University of Oaxaca
- ARM Benito Juárez (POLA-101), a Reformador-class frigate of the Mexican Navy.
- Benito Juárez (Mexibús), a BRT station in Chicoloapan

== Argentina ==
- Benito Juárez Partido, Buenos Aires Province
- Benito Juárez, Buenos Aires, Buenos Aires Province
- Benito Juárez Airport (Argentina)

== United States ==
- Benito Juarez Community Academy, Chicago, Illinois

== Sculptures ==
- Statue of Benito Juárez (disambiguation)

== See also ==
- Juárez (disambiguation)
