= General Jose de San Martin Memorial =

- U.S. National Register of Historic Places
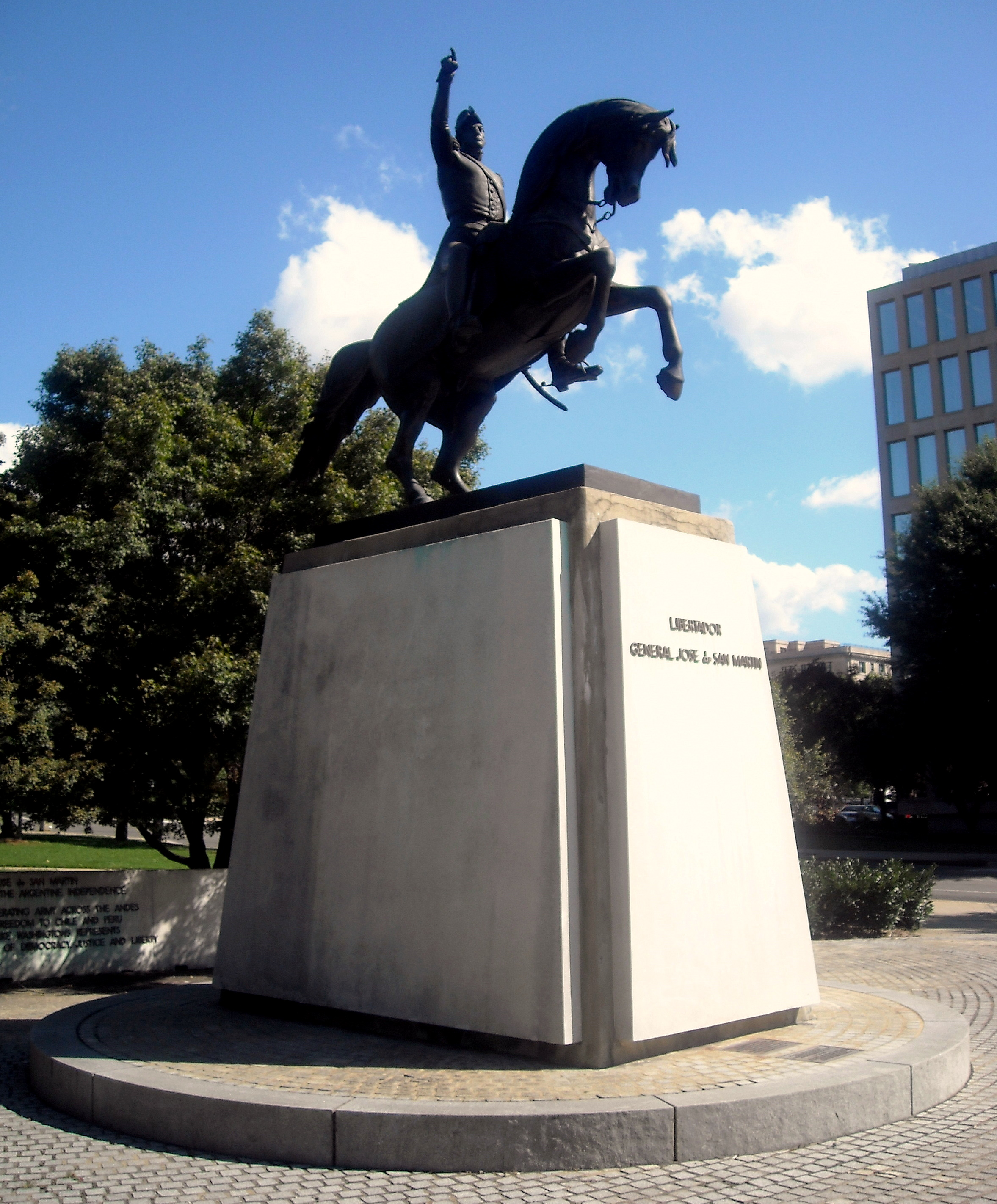
- Statue in 2008

- Location within Central Washington, D.C. Location within the District of Columbia Location within the United States
- Location: Virginia Avenue NW and 20th Street NW; Washington, D.C.
- Coordinates: 38°53′42″N 77°2′43″W
- Built: 1924
- Architect: Augustin-Alexandre Dumont
- Architectural style: Classical revival
- NRHP reference No.: 07001059

Significant dates
- Added to NRHP: October 12, 2007
- Designated: February 22, 2007

The General Jose de San Martin Memorial is an equestrian statue memorial of Argentine general and independence leader José de San Martín in Washington, D.C., United States.

The memorial is located at Virginia Avenue and 20th Street N.W. in the Foggy Bottom, Washington, D.C., near the United States Department of State.

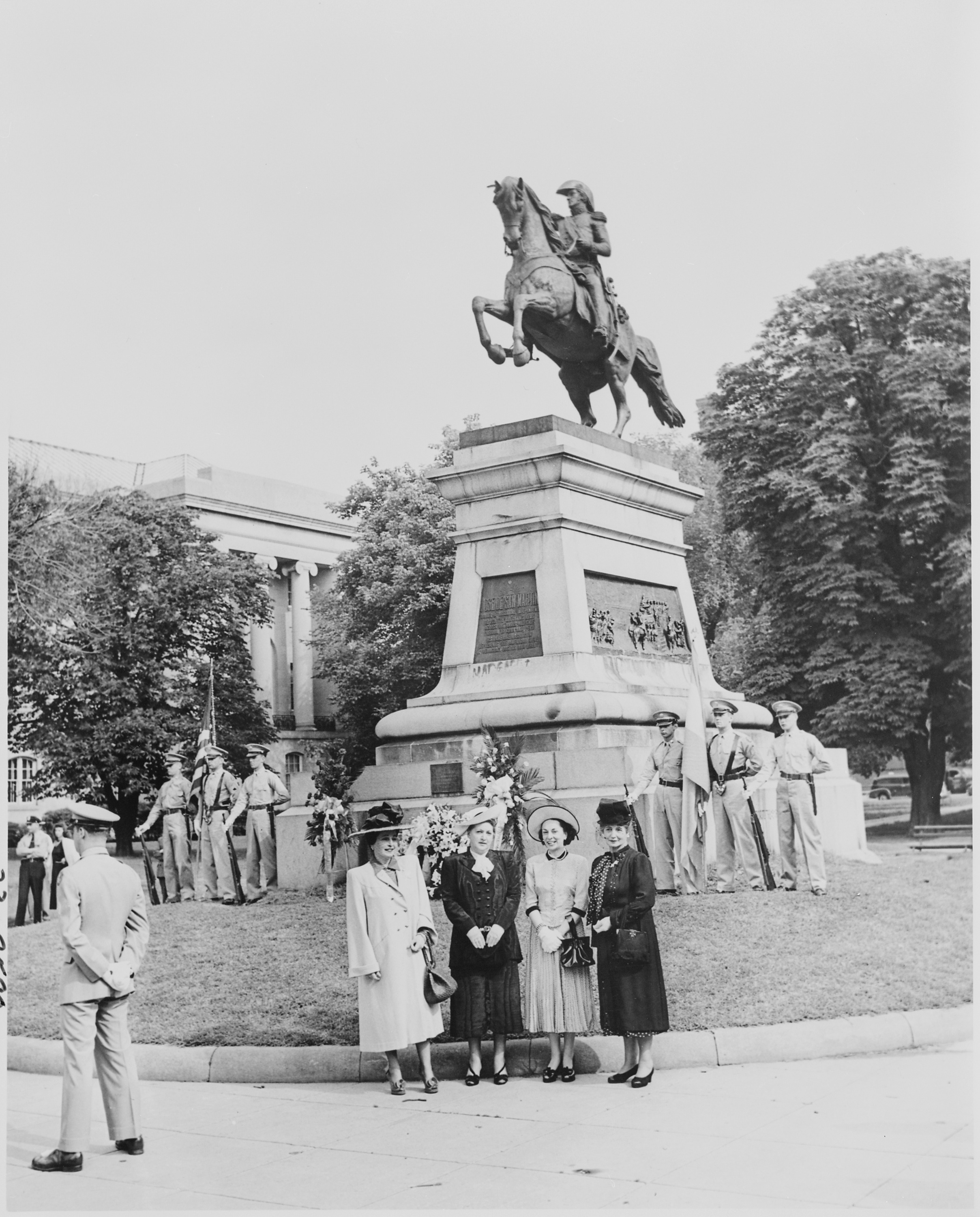
Statue at Judiciary Square

The memorial was sculpted by Augustin-Alexandre Dumont beginning in 1924. It is a replica of an original located at the Plaza San Martín in Buenos Aires. The memorial was a gift to the United States from Argentina and was dedicated on October 28, 1925. President Calvin Coolidge spoke at the dedication. It was rededicated on October 6, 1976.

== Plaquette ==
Next to the memorial is a plaque with the following text:

JOSE de SAN MARTIN
FOUNDER OF THE ARGENTINE INDEPENDENCE
HE LED THE LIBERATING ARMY ACROSS THE ANDES
AND GAVE FREEDOM TO CHILE AND PERU
HIS NAME LIKE WASHINGTON'S REPRESENTS
THE AMERICAN IDEAL OF DEMOCRACY, JUSTICE AND LIBERTY

== See also ==
- List of public art in Washington, D.C., Ward 2
- Statues of the Liberators
