= Enrique Alciati =

Italian sculptor

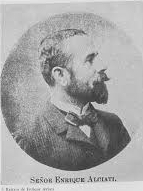
- Born: 19th century
- Died: After 1912
- Citizenship: French; Italian
- Occupation: Sculptor
- Years active: Late 19th century-early 20th century
- Known for: Statues
- Notable work: The Angel of Independence

Enrique Alciati (died after 1912) was a French/Italian sculptor and teacher, born in Marseille, France, who contributed various sculptures in France and Mexico. His most notable artwork is the Winged Victory that crowns the Independence Column in downtown Mexico City.

== Career ==
He began his career in Marseille as a sculptor following the French school. In 1886, he received an honorable mention for his works in the Salon des Artistes Français, where he exhibited regularly until 1913. In all his works Alciati adhered to the classical tradition, while the influence of Rodin is also quite prominent.

It is thought he moved to Mexico City in 1889, where he quickly won critical acclaim for his marble and bronze busts of Mexican personalities. In 1891 he was commissioned by the Mexican government to create statues of national heroes for Paseo de la Reforma, in Mexico City. Of special mention is the statue of Colonel Miguel López, for which Alciati won prizes at the 1893 World's Columbian Exposition in Chicago and the 1895 World's Fair in Atlanta, Georgia.

Alciati was appointed professor of sculpture, decoration and modelling at the Escuela Nacional de Bellas Artes in 1895. At the beginning of the 20th century he was commissioned by the then President Porfirio Díaz to create most of the sculptures for the Independence Column in Mexico City under the direction of Antonio Rivas Mercado. While he made the marbles in Mexico and Florence, he cast the bronzes exclusively in the Italian city.

== Sculptures ==
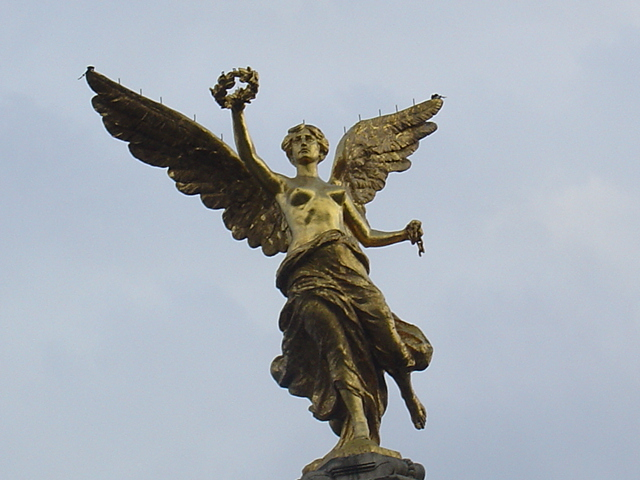
El Ángel de la Independencia

Most of his late works are spread over the Mexico City downtown area, some of these include:

- Various busts of prominent Mexicans along Paseo de la Reforma.
- A bust of Josefa Ortíz de Domínguez located in the Plaza de Santo Domingo, northwest of the Metropolitan Cathedral.
- Sculptures that decorate the Postal Palace, across the street from Bellas Artes.
- A statue of Benito Juárez given as a gift to the United States government and now located in the Foggy Bottom neighborhood of Washington, DC, near the Department of State.

== See also ==
- Sculpture
- Statues of the Liberators
