= Seaton Park (Washington D.C.) =

Park in Washington, D.C., U.S.

- Chinatown Park
- Location within Central Washington, D.C.
- Location: Massachusetts Ave. & I St., to 5th & 6th Sts., NWWashington, D.C.
- Coordinates: 38°54′04″N 77°01′06″W
- Area: 0.31 acres (0.13 ha)
- Operator: National Park Service, National Mall and Memorial Parks

Seaton Park is a neighborhood-named pocket park located on National Park Service property at south of Massachusetts Avenue and north of I Street NW between 5th and 6th St NW in the Chinatown neighborhood of Washington, D.C. It is also referred to as Chinatown Park.
