= Statue of Benito Juárez (New York City) =

Statue in Manhattan, New York, U.S.

Benito Juárez
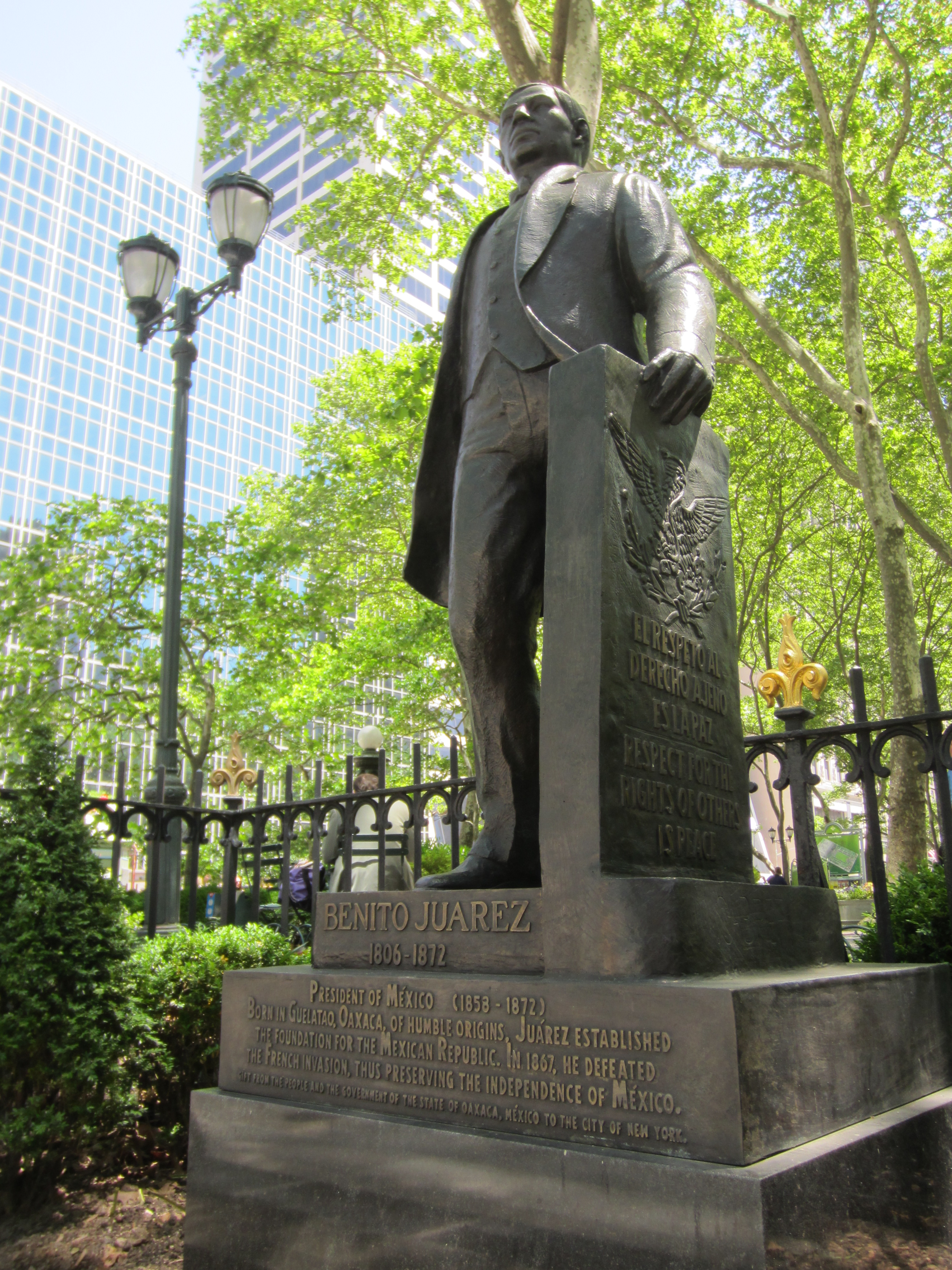
- The sculpture in 2014
- Artist: Moises Cabrera Orozco
- Year: 2002
- Type: Sculpture
- Medium: Bronze
- Subject: Benito Juárez
- Location: New York City, New York, United States; 40.753808°N 73.984638°W

Benito Juárez is an outdoor bronze sculpture of Benito Juárez by Moises Cabrera Orozco, located in Bryant Park in Manhattan, New York. Donated by the State of Oaxaca on behalf of the Mexican Government and the Mexican Trade Center, the portrait sculpture was cast in Mexico in 2002 and installed on October 9, 2004. It is the most recent statue in the park, and the first to depict a Mexican.

== See also ==
- Statue of Benito Juárez (Chicago)
- Statue of Benito Juárez (San Diego)
- Statue of Benito Juárez (Washington, D.C.)
