= Juan Manuel Blanes =

Uruguayan painter (1830–1901)

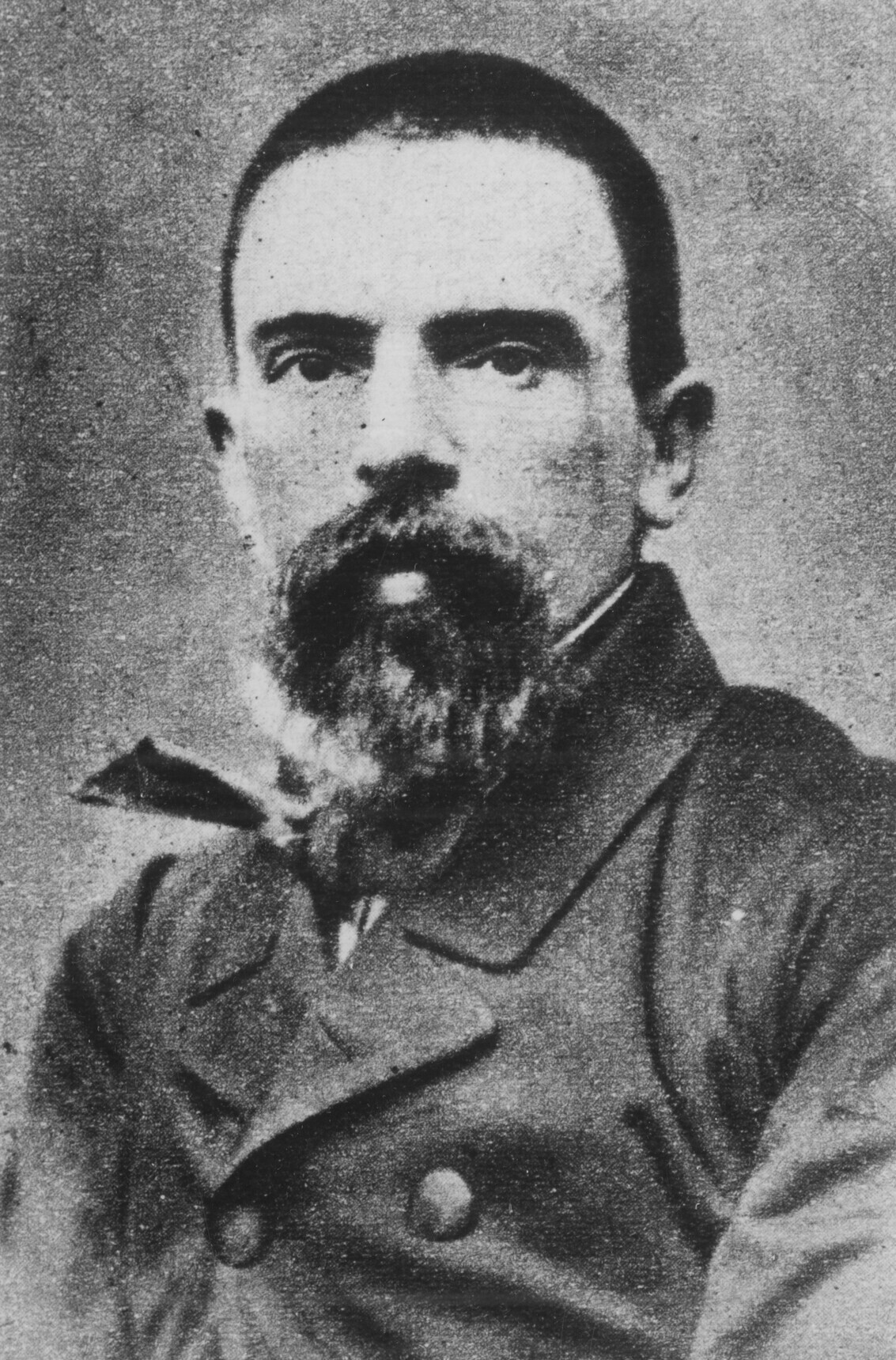
- Blanes in 1872
- Born: 8 June 1830; Montevideo, Uruguay
- Died: 15 April 1901 (aged 70); Pisa, Italy
- Known for: Painting, portraiture, historical art
- Notable work: Episode of Yellow Fever, Oath of the Thirty-three Easterners, Artigas en la Ciudadela
- Style: Realism
- Spouse: María Linari
- Children: Juan Luis Blanes, Nicanor Blanes
- Memorials: Blanes Museum, Montevideo

Juan Manuel Blanes (June 8, 1830 – April 15, 1901) was a Uruguayan painter of the Realist school.

== Life and work ==
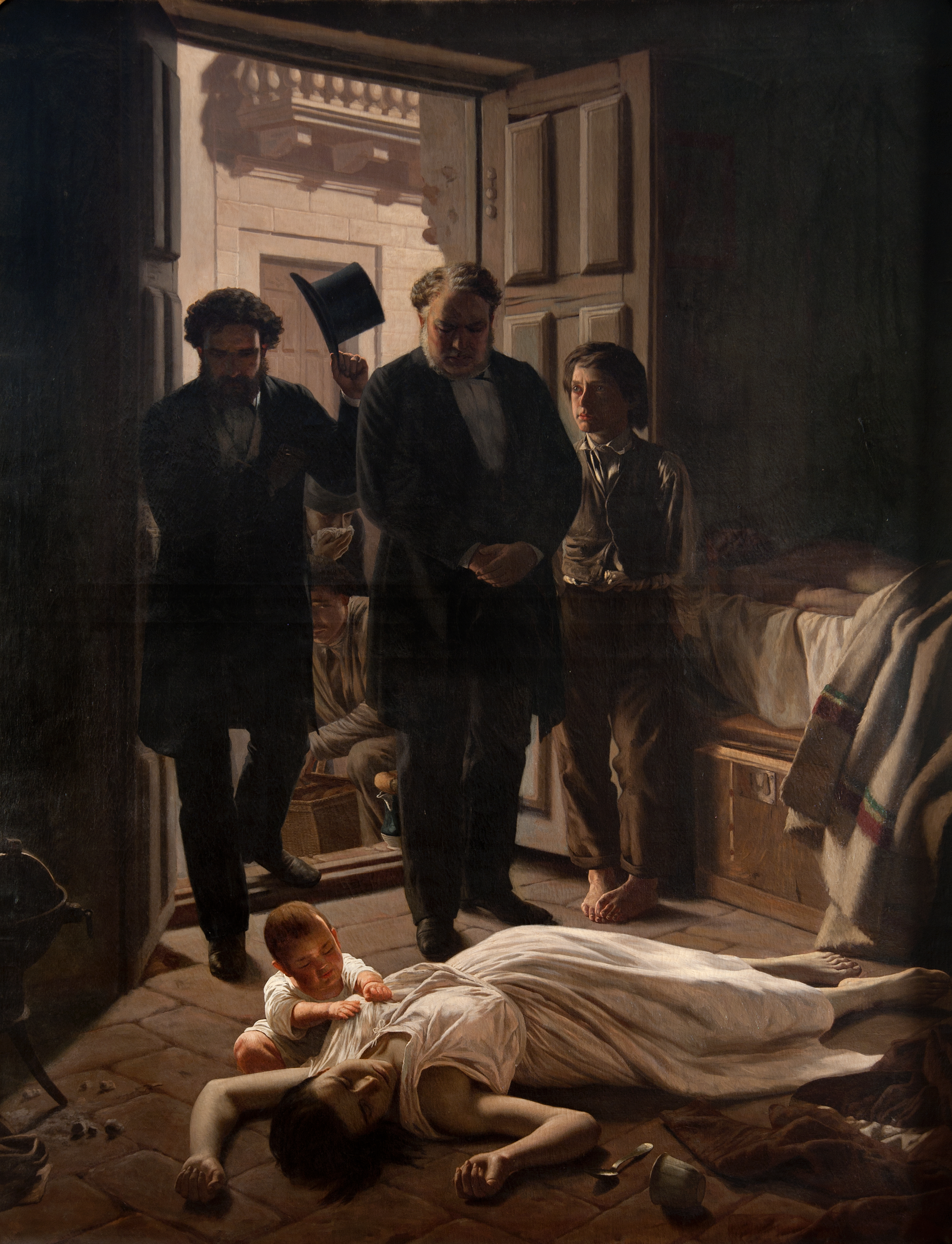
Episode of Yellow Fever (1871)

Blanes was born in Montevideo, Uruguay, in 1830. He was raised by his mother, with whom he relocated to the countryside in his early teens. Blanes took an interest in drawing at this point, and shortly afterwards, was hired as an illustrator for a Montevideo daily newspaper, El Defensor de la Independencia Americana. Earning extra income with watercolors, he returned to his mother and, in 1854, established his first atelier.

He married María Linari, and in 1855, the couple settled in Salto, where he worked as a portrait painter. They relocated to Concepción del Uruguay (across the Uruguay River, in Argentina) in 1857, and Blanes was commissioned by Argentine President Justo José de Urquiza to complete a number of portraits, allegories and landscapes to grace his nearby estancia, the Palacio San José. Returning to Montevideo in 1861, the talented painter obtained a scholarship from the Uruguayan government, and with it, traveled with his family to Florence, Italy, where he studied under Antonio Ciseri until 1864.

The experience became a valuable calling card for Blanes, who became one of Uruguay's most sought-after portraiteurs. The 1871 outbreak of a yellow fever epidemic in Buenos Aires inspired his first renowned work, which he exhibited to acclaim in the recovering city. His 1872 portrait of the Argentine War of Independence hero, General José de San Martín (The Review in Rancagua), was also a success in Buenos Aires, and Blanes was invited to Chile to display the historic depiction.

=== Works of Uruguayan national importance ===
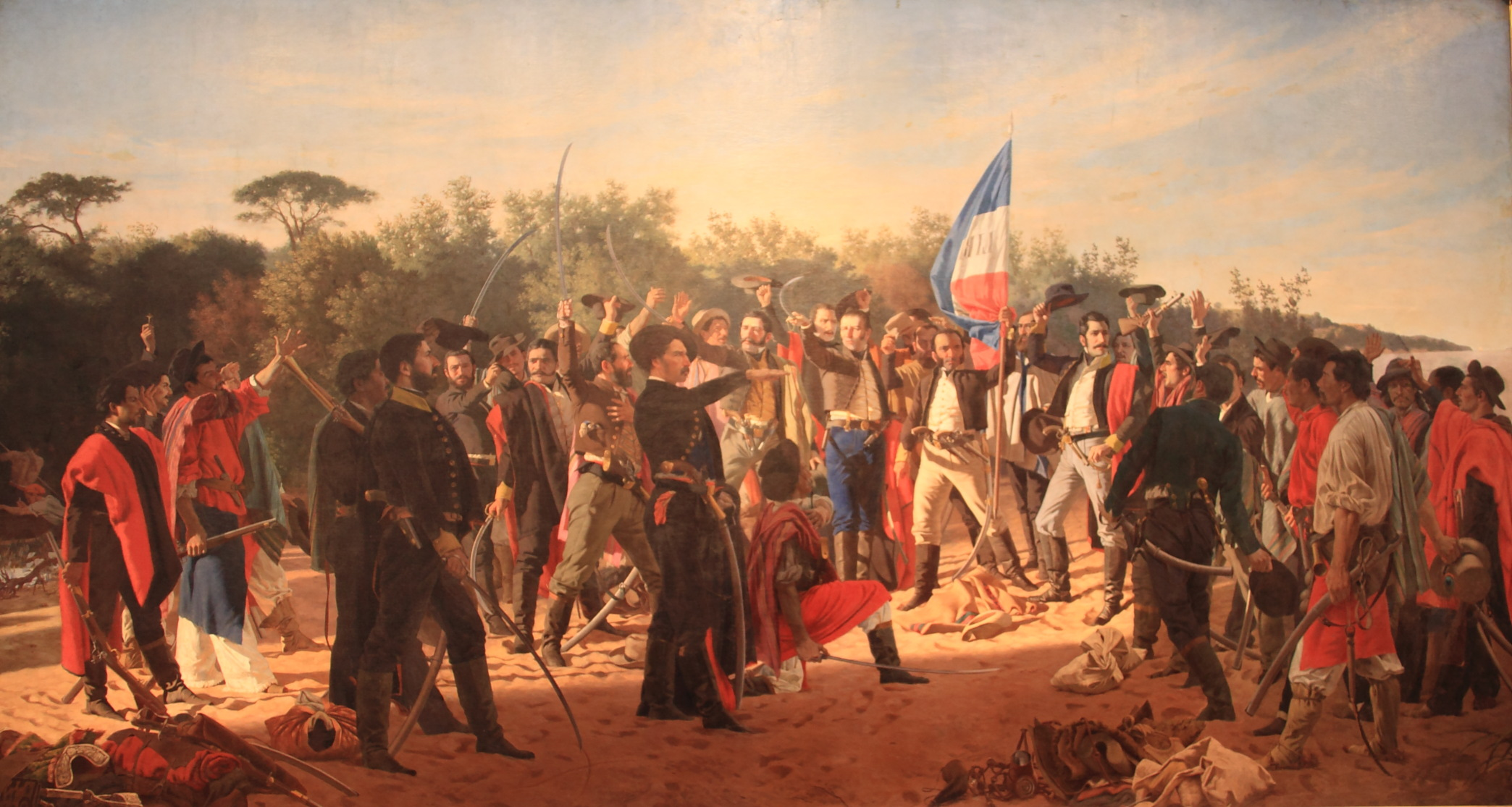
Oath of the Thirty-three Easterners (1878)

Returning to Uruguay, Blanes undertook a portrait of the "Thirty-three Easterners", members of a revolutionary vanguard whose insurrection against Brazilian authorities resulted in Uruguayan Independence, in 1828. The portrait's 1877 display was followed by Blanes' second stay in Florence, where he completed The Battle of Sarandí, a depiction of another milestone in Uruguay's nationhood. These works, and his bucolic portraits of life in his homeland did not garner the interest he expected in Italy, however, and the Blaneses returned to Montevideo in the early 1880s.

Blanes resumed his portrait work, which remained popular among the local gentry. Among the most notable was a portrait of President Máximo Santos, commissioned by friends of the ruler as a gift. The most well known from this later period, however, was Artigas en la Ciudadela, an homage to one of Uruguay's most respected early patriots, José Gervasio Artigas.

=== Later life and legacy ===
This success was followed by the 1889 death of Blanes' wife, however, and he and his younger son, Nicanor, spent the next two years in Rome, where his elder son, Juan Luis, had settled.

He returned to Uruguay alone, and continued to create historic and landscape art. A few years later, Juan Luis lost his life in an accident and in 1899, Nicanor disappeared in Pisa. Blanes hurried to the Tuscan city in hopes of locating his son, and a friend from a previous visit made him a guest in her house. Searching for nearly two years, the 70-year-old Blanes died in Ms. Manetti's Vía di Mezzo residence.

The city of Montevideo established the Municipal Museum of Fine Arts, and named it in his honor, in 1930; many of his best-known works are also displayed in the National Museum of Visual Arts. The statue of José Gervasio Artigas in Washington, D.C., based on Blanes's portrait, was cast in bronze in Uruguay during World War II as a gift to the United States.

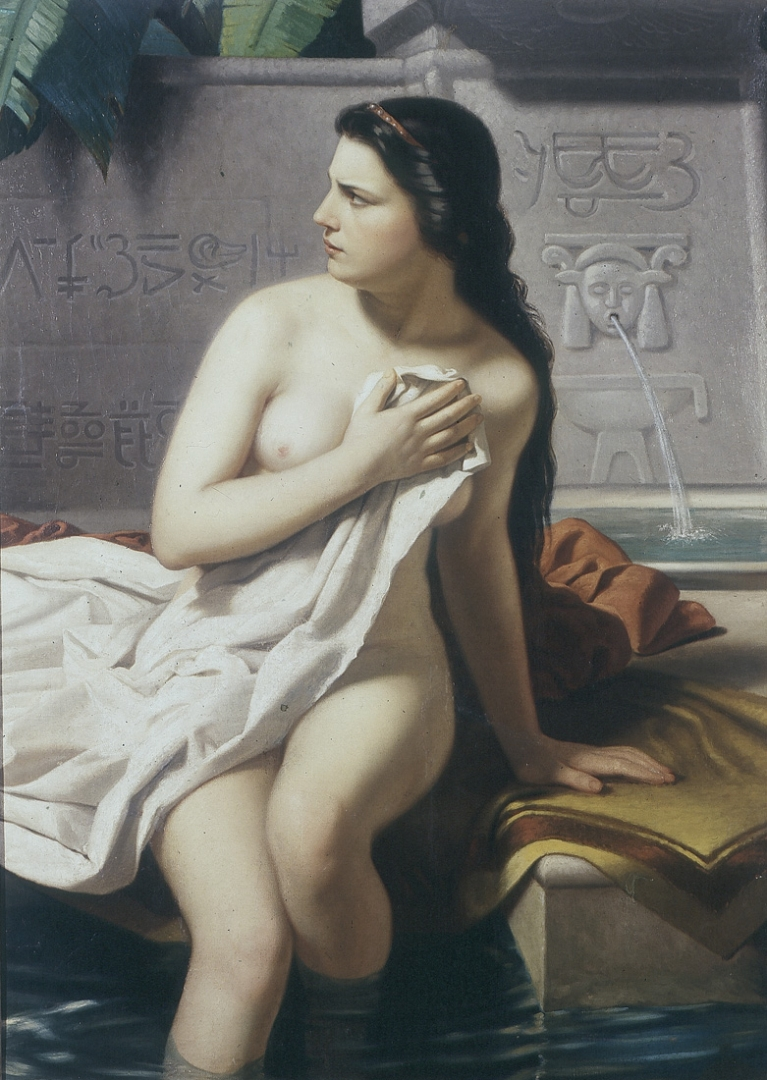
The Pure Susanna

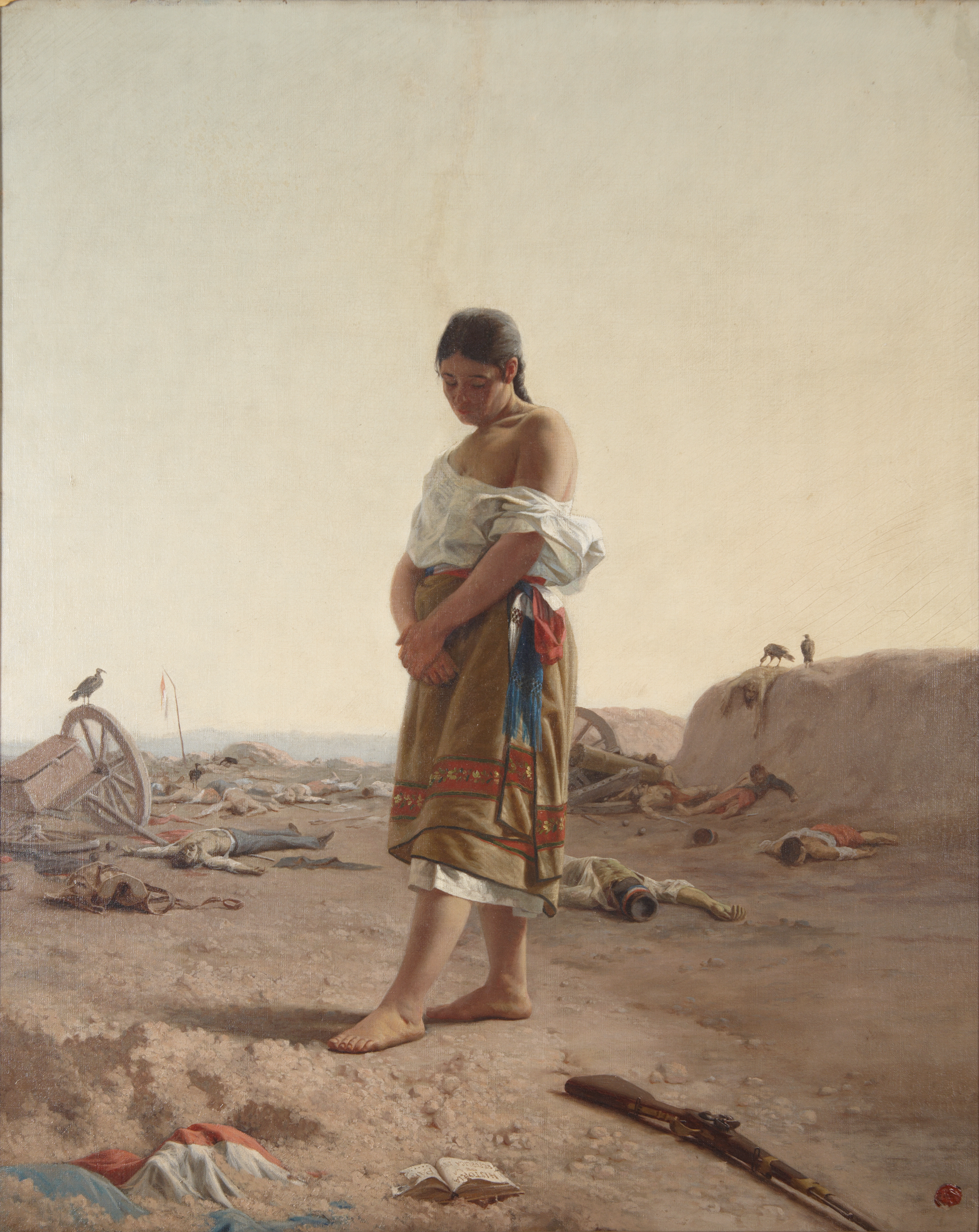
The Paraguayan Woman (1879)

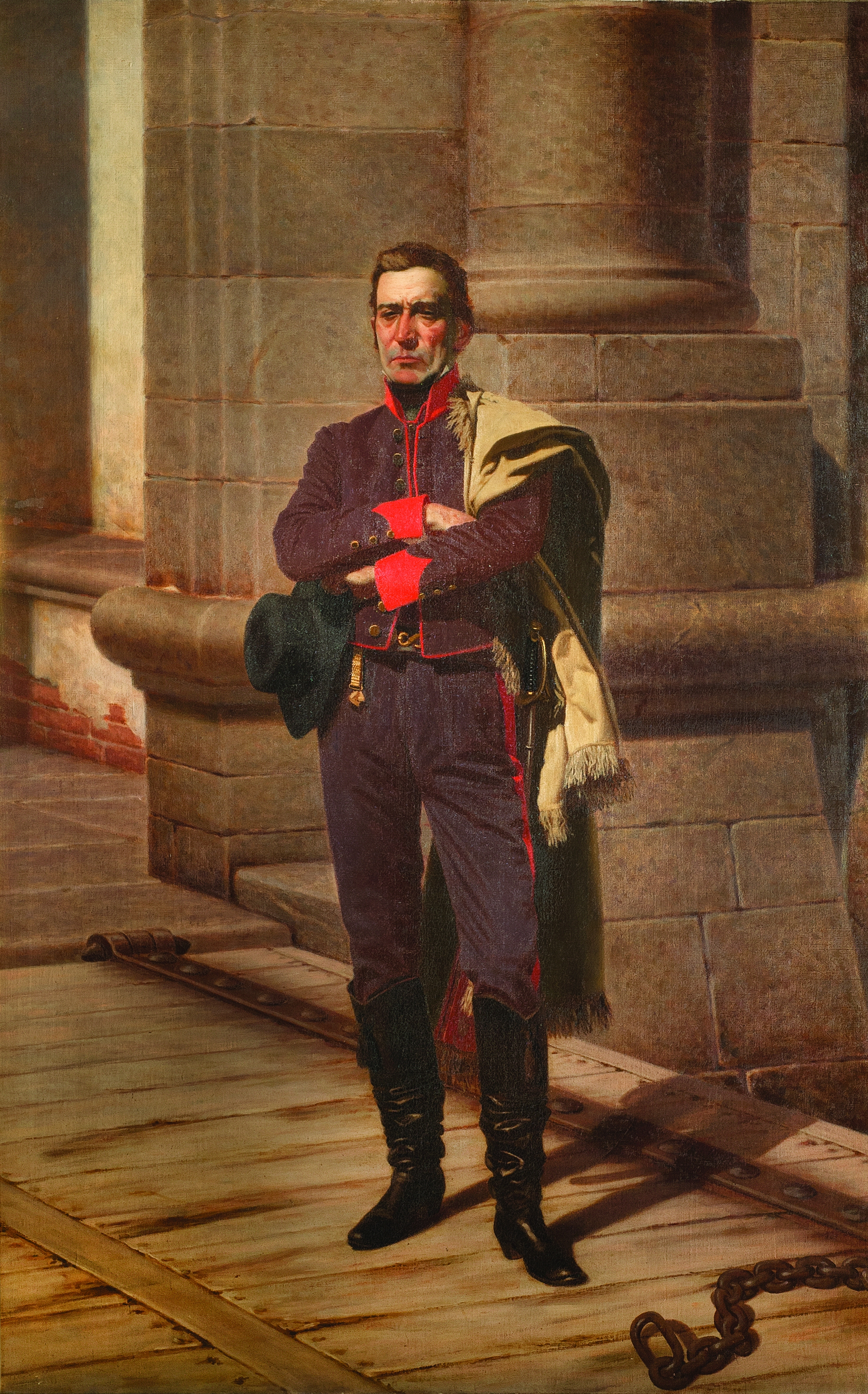
Artigas in Ciudadela (1884)

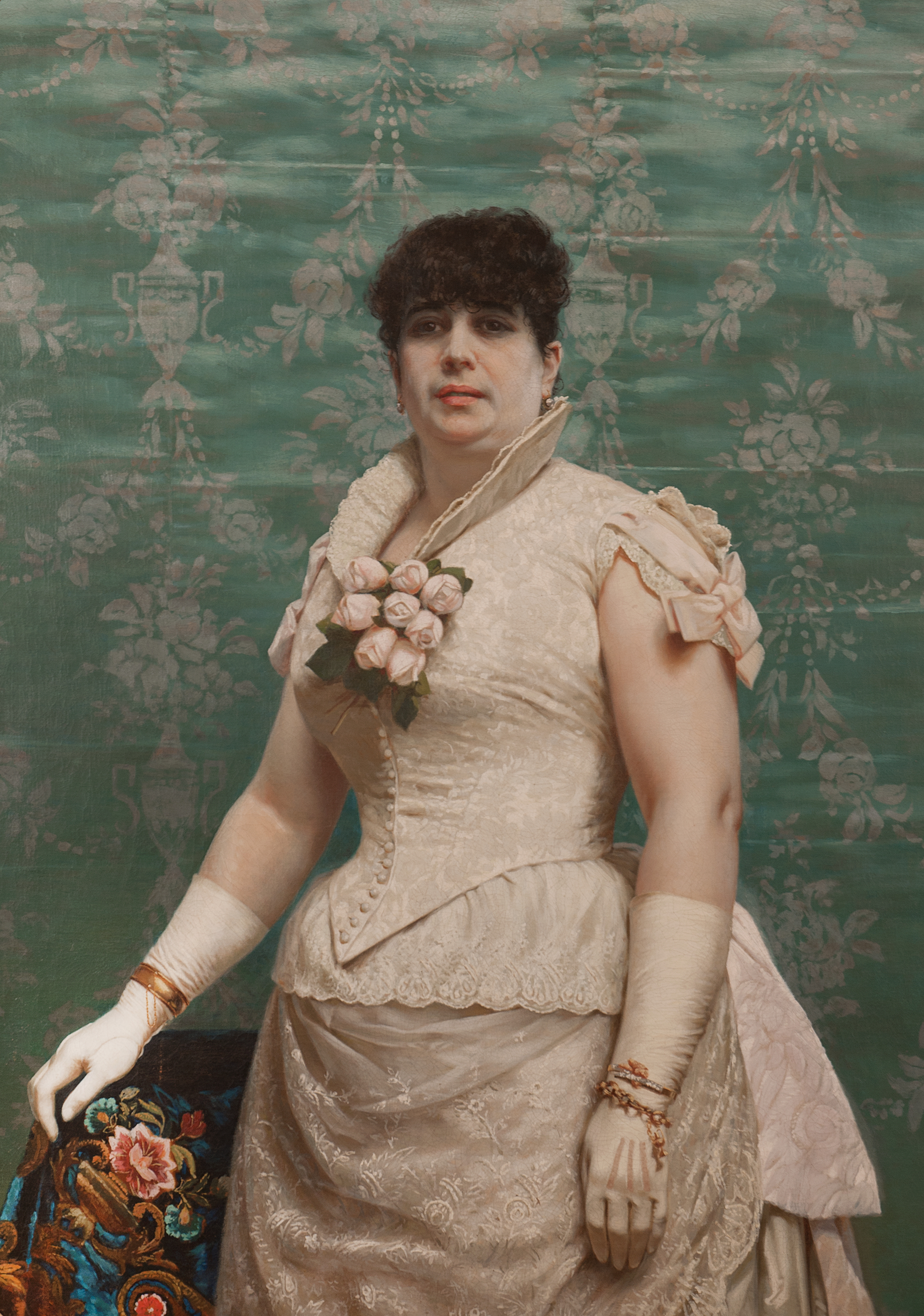
Portrait of Doña Carlota Ferreira
