= Statue of Benito Juárez (San Diego) =

Statue by Ernesto Tamariz in San Diego, California, U.S.

Benito Juárez
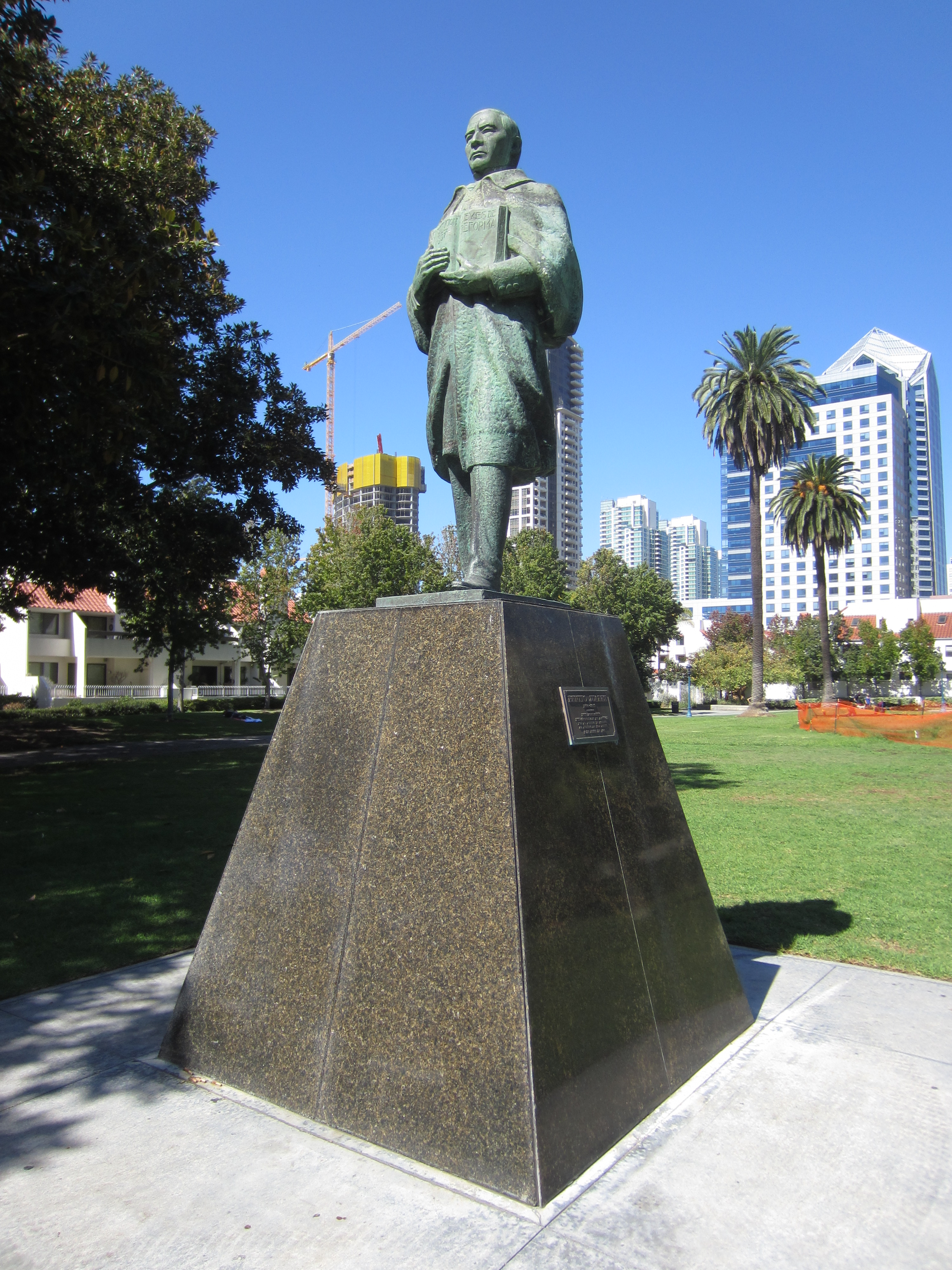
- The statue in 2016
- Artist: Ernesto Tamariz
- Medium: Bronze sculpture
- Subject: Benito Juárez
- Location: San Diego, California, United States; 32°42′46″N 117°10′04″W

Benito Juárez is a bronze sculpture in Pantoja Park in San Diego, California. Created by Mexican sculptor Ernesto Tamariz, it depicts Benito Juárez, the president of Mexico from 1858 to 1872. The statue was a gift from the Mexican government in 1981.

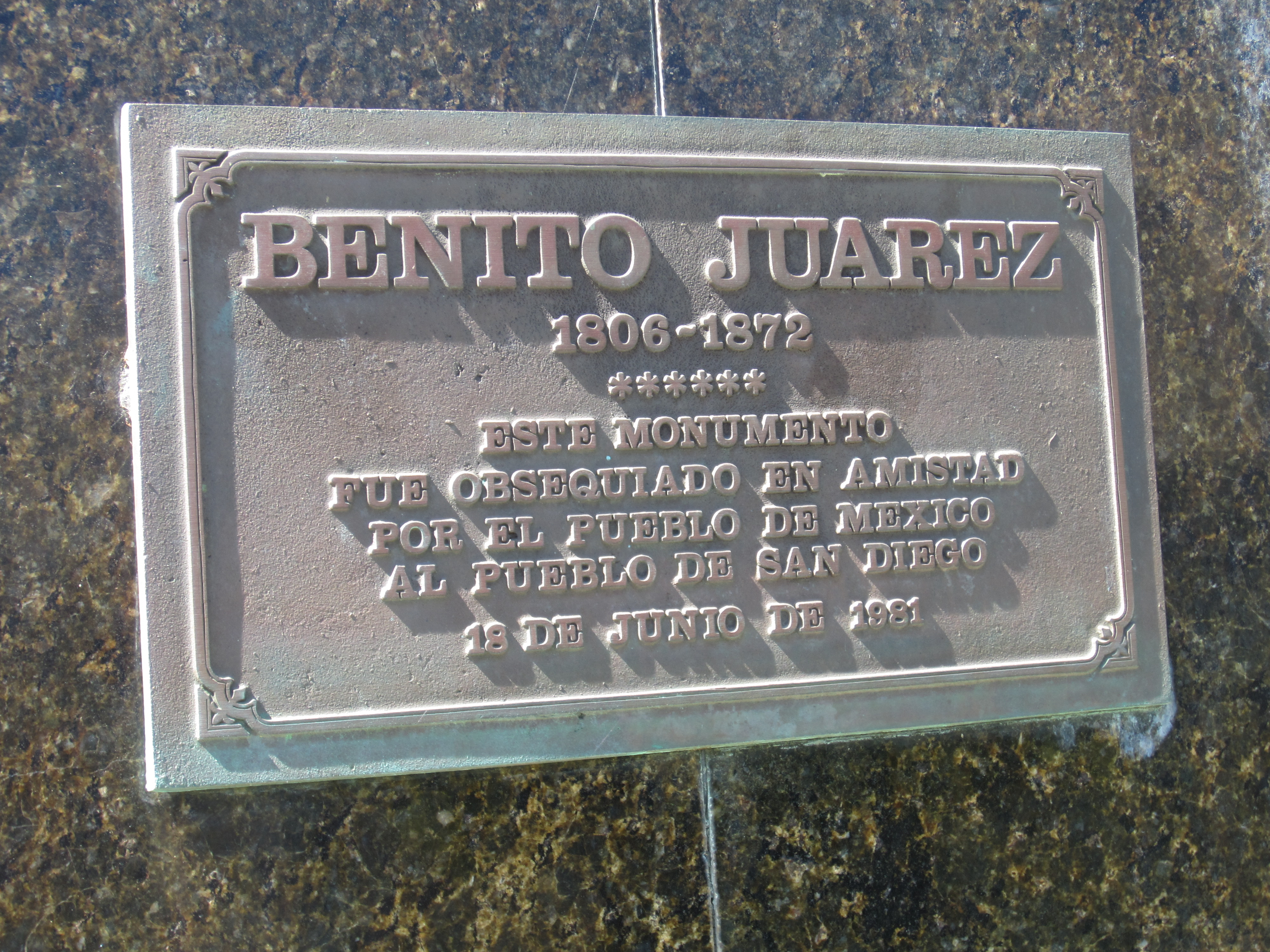
Plaque for the sculpture

== See also ==
- Statue of Benito Juárez (Chicago)
- Statue of Benito Juárez (New York City)
