= Statue of Benito Juárez (Washington, D.C.) =

Artwork by Enrique Alciati

Benito Juarez
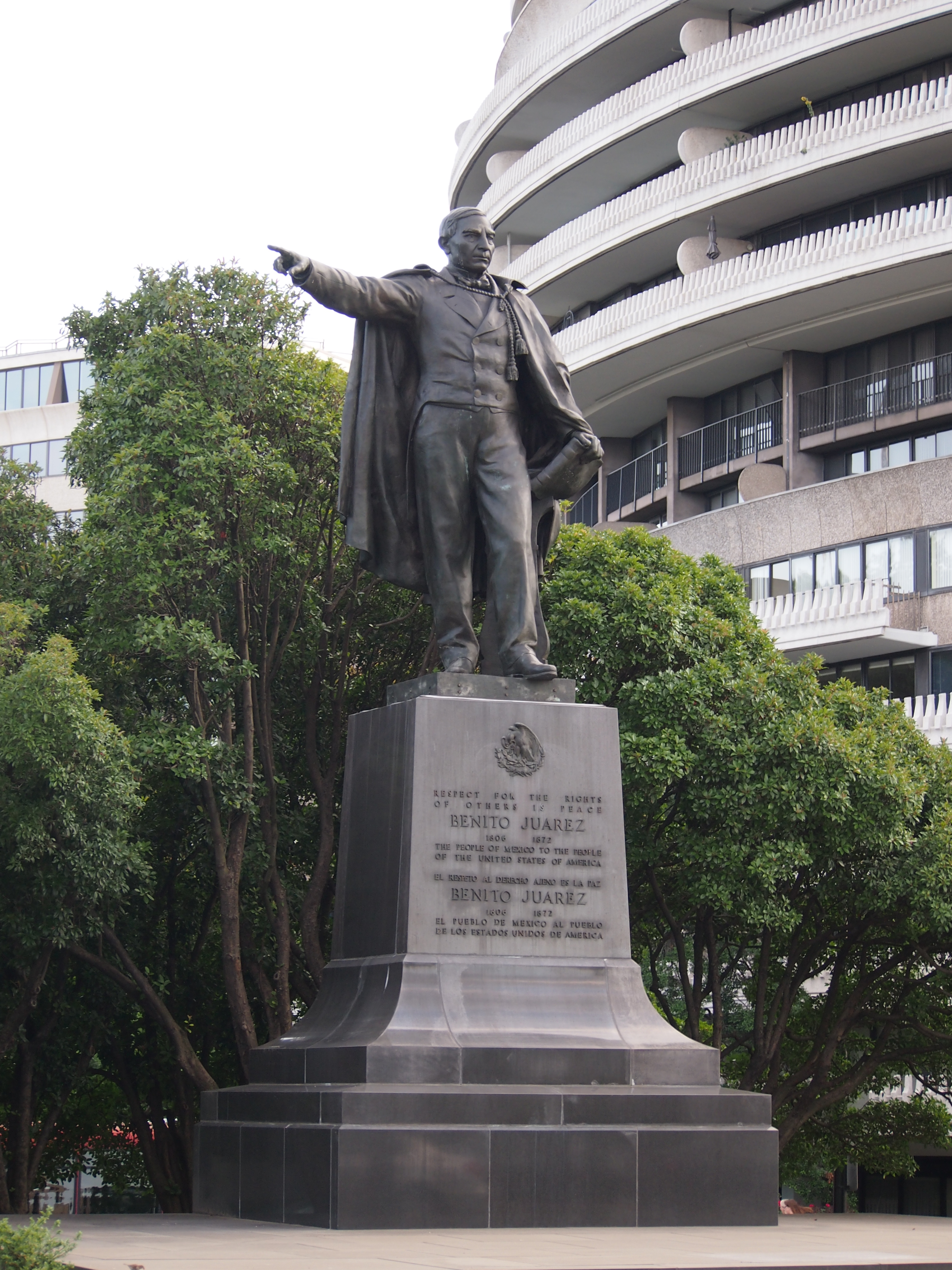
- Statue of Benito Juárez in 2014
- Artist: Enrique Alciati; Luis Ortiz Monasterio
- Year: 1891
- Type: Bronze
- Dimensions: 580 cm × 270 cm × 110 cm (228 in × 108 in × 43.2 in)
- Location: Virginia Avenue & New Hampshire N.W., Washington, D.C., United States; 38°53′55.59″N 77°3′13.09″W
- Owner: National Park Service

Benito Juárez is the title of a work of art by Enrique Alciati, located at the intersection of Virginia Avenue and New Hampshire Avenue in Washington, District of Columbia, United States. The statue is a part of the city's Statues of the Liberators collection and is a tribute to former president of Mexico, Benito Juárez.

== Description ==
The bronze sculpture is a full body of Benito Juárez standing with his right arm raised and pointing into the distance. His right hand rests on a book, called Reforma, on top of a low pedestal. He wears a short double-breasted jacket with a long cape over his shoulders. The sculpture sits on a granite base and is inscribed:

A. CENCETFI (sic)
SCULTORE
ROMA 1891

The front base reads:

Respect for the rights
of others is peace
BENITO JUAREZ
1806–1872
The people of Mexico to the people
of the United States of America

Translation to Spanish:
El respeto al derecho ajeno es paz
BENITO JUAREZ
1806–1872
El pueblo de Mexico al pueblo
de los Estados Unidos de America

The names of the sculptors, Luis Sosa Villasenor and Louis Ortiz Macedo, are written on the lower back corner of the base, along with the date: Diciembre 1968 (December 1968).

== Information ==
The sculpture was a gift to the United States from the people of Mexico in exchange for a statue of Abraham Lincoln from President Lyndon B. Johnson. The original statue of Juarez, which stands in Oaxaca, Mexico, was cast in Rome by the Nelli Foundry in 1891. The Washington statue is a cast of the original. It was authorized on October 17, 1968 and was cast at Fundidores Artísticos in Mexico City under the guidance of R. Moreno. The plasterwork was completed by Luis Ortiz Monesterio. The granite base was designed in the United States. The back of the base has a hidden urn which contains soil from San Pablo Guelatao, where Juárez was born. The piece sits in a plaza at an intersection with an inscription that reads:

En este sitio fue depositada
tierra de Guelatao, Oaxaca,
lugar de origen del presidente
Benito Juarez
7 de enero de 1969.

("In this site was laid soil from Guelatao, Oaxaca, birthplace of President Benito Juarez – 7 January 1969".)

The sculpture is owned and maintained by the National Park Service (NPS).

== Condition ==
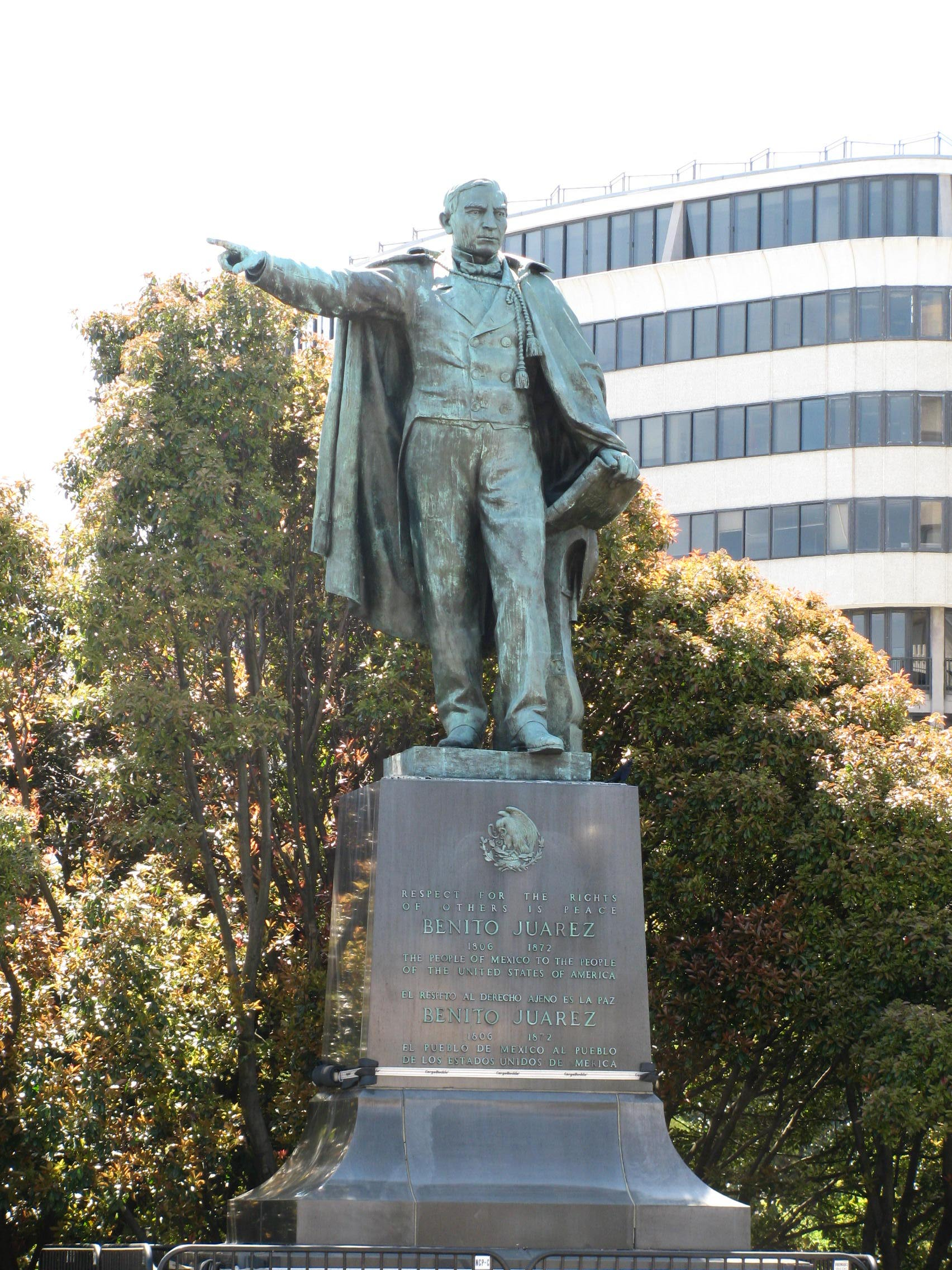
The statue before undergoing conservation by the National Park Service

In 1993 the Smithsonian Institution's Save Outdoor Sculpture! surveyed the sculpture and stated its conservation status as well maintained. Starting in November 2011, the National Park Service began repairs and rehabilitation on the monument and plaza. The base of the statue deteriorated, needing repair, and in November 2005 temporary restraining was placed around the base of the statue to help control the slippage of the facing stones on the monument base. A temporary barrier was placed around the base to deter pedestrian access. In 2010 the NPS contracted Oehrlein & Associates Architects to survey the sculpture and develop a repair plan. Using that report, NPS planned to repair the granite on both the pedestal and in the plaza, clean and repair the statue, repair loose lettering and reinstall missing lettering, and finally, waterproof the statue. The work, due to be completed by spring 2012, will be completed on site.

== See also ==
- List of public art in Washington, D.C., Ward 2
- Statues of the Liberators
