= Virginia Avenue =

Street in Washington, DC

Coordinates: 38°53′47.1″N 77°2′55.4″W

- Virginia Avenue NW; Virginia Avenue SW; Virginia Avenue SE
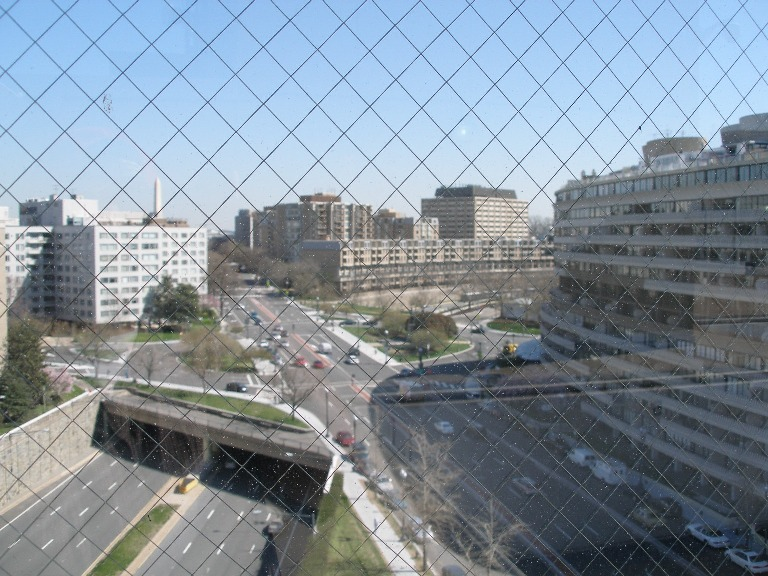
- View of Virginia Avenue from the roof of the Hall on Virginia Avenue
- Interactive map of Virginia Avenue
- Maintained by: DDOT
- Location: Washington, D.C., U.S.
- West end: Rock Creek Parkway
- Major junctions: New Hampshire Avenue; 23rd Street; E Street Expressway; Constitution Avenue; 7th Street; South Capitol Street; I-695
- East end: 9th / L Streets

Virginia Avenue is a street in the Northwest, Southwest, and Southeast quadrants of Washington, D.C. Like other state-named streets in Washington, it diagonally crosses the grid pattern formed by lettered (east-west) and numbered (north-south) streets.

Many famous landmarks are adjacent to Virginia Avenue, including the Watergate complex, George Washington University's former Hall on Virginia Avenue (which, even earlier branded as a Howard Johnson's hotel, served as the lookout point for the Watergate break-in in 1972), the Pan-American Health Organization, the Harry S. Truman Building (Department of State headquarters), the Main Interior Building (Department of the Interior headquarters), the John F. Kennedy Center for the Performing Arts, and West Potomac Park.

The western terminus of Virginia Avenue NW is at the Rock Creek and Potomac Parkway. Virginia Avenue provides access from the Parkway to Interstate 66. The eastern terminus is at Constitution Avenue between 17th and 18th streets. Between those termini, there is a partial interchange with the E Street Expressway. Non-contiguous portions of Virginia Avenue are found in Southwest, paralleling the CSX railroad tracks, and Southeast, paralleling the Southeast Freeway.

As of February 2021, the District of Columbia Department of Transportation proposes bicycle lanes for Virginia Avenue NW between Constitution Avenue and the Rock Creek and Potomac Parkway.

== See also ==
- Virginia Avenue Tunnel (Railroad tunnel - CSX Transportation)
- Statues of the Liberators
