= Benito Juárez =

President of Mexico from 1858 to 1872

The Most Excellent Benito Juárez
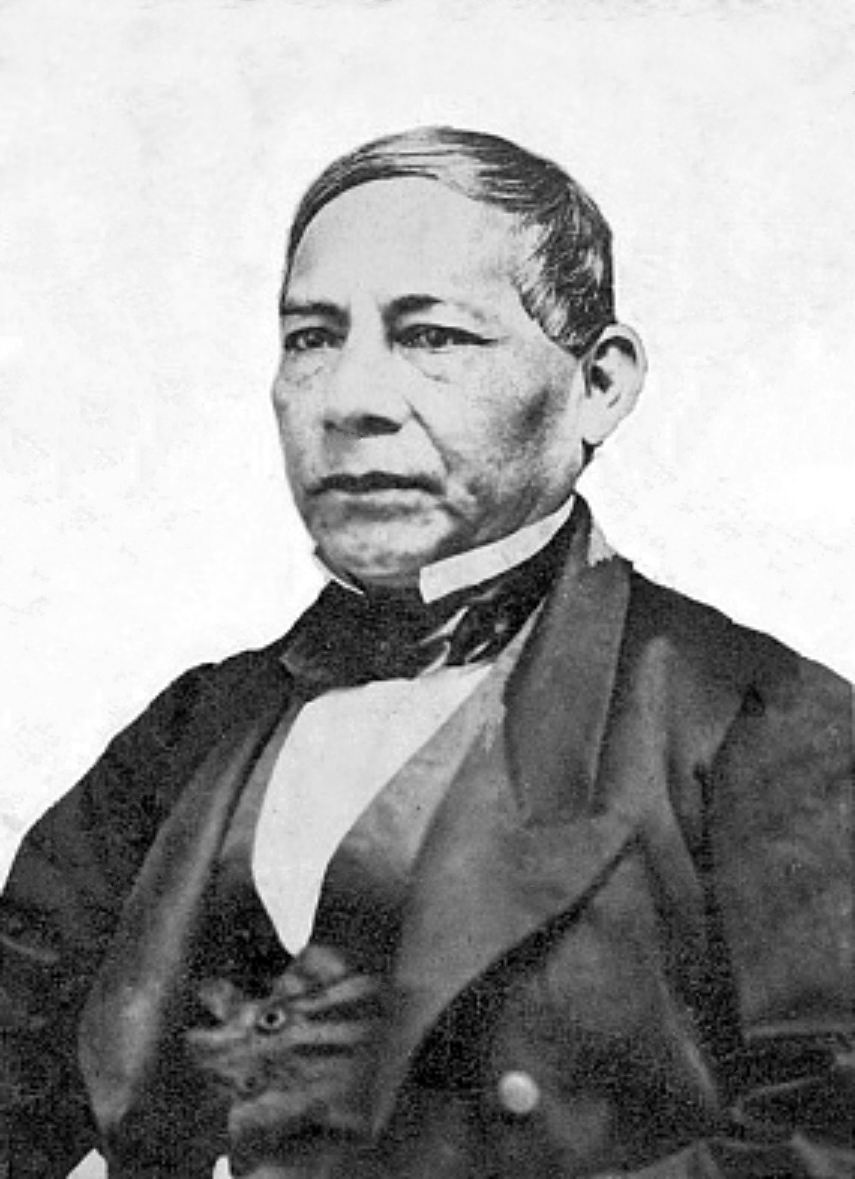
- Juárez c. 1872

26th President of Mexico
- In office 21 January 1858 – 18 July 1872
- Preceded by: Ignacio Comonfort
- Succeeded by: Sebastián Lerdo de Tejada

President of the Supreme Court of Mexico
- In office 11 December 1857 – 21 January 1858
- Preceded by: Luis de la Rosa Oteiza
- Succeeded by: José Ignacio Pavón

Secretary of the Interior
- In office 3 November – 11 December 1857
- President: Ignacio Comonfort
- Preceded by: José María Cortés
- Succeeded by: José María Cortés

Governor of Oaxaca
- In office 10 January 1856 – 3 November 1857
- Preceded by: José María García
- Succeeded by: José María Díaz
- In office 2 October 1847 – 12 August 1852
- Preceded by: Francisco Ortiz Zárate
- Succeeded by: Lope San Germán

Secretary of Public Education of Mexico
- In office 6 October – 9 December 1855
- President: Juan Álvarez
- Preceded by: José María Durán
- Succeeded by: Ramón Isaac Alcaraz

Personal details
- Born: Benito Pablo Juárez García; 21 March 1806 San Pablo Guelatao, Oaxaca, New Spain
- Died: 18 July 1872 (aged 66) Mexico City, Mexico
- Resting place: Panteón de San Fernando, Mexico City
- Party: Liberal Party
- Spouse: Margarita Maza (m. 1843; died 1871)
- Education: Institute of Sciences and Arts of Oaxaca
- Profession: Lawyer; judge; politician; military officer

Benito Pablo Juárez García (Latin American Spanish: [beˈnito ˈpaβlo ˈxwaɾes ɣaɾˈsi.a]; 21 March 1806 – 16 July 1872) was a Mexican politician, military officer, and lawyer who served as the 26th president of Mexico from 1858 until his death in 1872. A Zapotec, he was the first Indigenous president of Mexico (Note: Juárez is sometimes described as Mexico's only Indigenous president, however, this is disputed. Victoriano Huerta was of prominent Huichol descent, spoke the Huichol language, and Juárez told a young Huerta that, "From Indians who educate themselves like you, the Fatherland expects much" (Spanish: De los indios que se educan como usted, la Patria espera mucho). Porfirio Díaz had significant Mixtec ancestry. Both, though, came to power through a coup rather than were elected.) and the first democratically elected Indigenous president in postcolonial America. A member of the Liberal Party, he previously held a number of offices, including the governorship of Oaxaca and the presidency of the Supreme Court. During his presidency, he led the Liberals to victory in the Reform War and in the Second French intervention in Mexico.

Born in Oaxaca to a poor rural Indigenous family and orphaned as a child, Juárez passed into the care of his uncle, eventually moving to Oaxaca City at the age of 12, where he found work as a domestic servant. Sponsored by his employer, who was also a lay Franciscan, Juárez temporarily enrolled in a seminary and studied to become a priest, but later switched his studies to law at the Institute of Sciences and Arts, where he became active in liberal politics. He began to practice law and was eventually appointed as a judge, after which he married Margarita Maza, a woman from a socially distinguished family in Oaxaca City.

Juárez was eventually elected governor of Oaxaca and became involved in national politics following the ousting and exile of Antonio López de Santa Anna in the Plan of Ayutla. The new president, Juan Álvarez, appointed a liberal cabinet that included Juárez as Minister of Justice.

He was instrumental in passing the Juárez Law as part of the broader program of constitutional reforms known as La Reforma (The Reform). Later, as the head of the Supreme Court, he succeeded to the presidency upon the resignation of the Liberal president Ignacio Comonfort in the early weeks of the Reform War between the Liberal Party and the Conservative Party, and led the Liberal Party to victory after three years of warfare.

Almost immediately after the Reform War had ended, President Juárez was faced with a French invasion, the Second French Intervention aimed at overthrowing the government of the Mexican Republic and replacing it with a French-aligned monarchy, the Second Mexican Empire. The French soon gained the collaboration of the Conservative Party, which aimed at returning themselves to power after their defeat in the Reform War, but Juárez continued to lead the government and armed forces of the Mexican Republic, even as he was forced by the advances of the French to flee to the north of the country. The Second Mexican Empire would finally collapse in 1867 after the departure of the last French troops two months previously and President Juárez returned to Mexico City, where he continued as president, but with growing opposition from fellow Liberals who believed he was becoming autocratic, until his death due to a heart attack in 1872.

During his presidency, he supported many controversial measures, including his negotiation of the McLane–Ocampo Treaty, which would have granted the United States perpetual extraterritorial rights across the Isthmus of Tehuantepec; a decree extending his presidential term for the duration of French Intervention; his proposal to revise the liberal Constitution of 1857 to strengthen the power of the federal government; and his decision to run for reelection in 1871. His opponent, liberal general and fellow Oaxacan Porfirio Díaz, opposed his re-election and rebelled against Juárez in the Plan de la Noria.

After his death, the city of Oaxaca added "de Juárez" to its name in his honor, and numerous other places and institutions have been named after him. He is the only individual whose birthday (21 March) is celebrated as a national public and patriotic holiday in Mexico. Many cities (most notably Ciudad Juárez), streets, institutions, and other locations are named after him. He is considered the most popular Mexican president of the 19th century.

== Early life and education ==
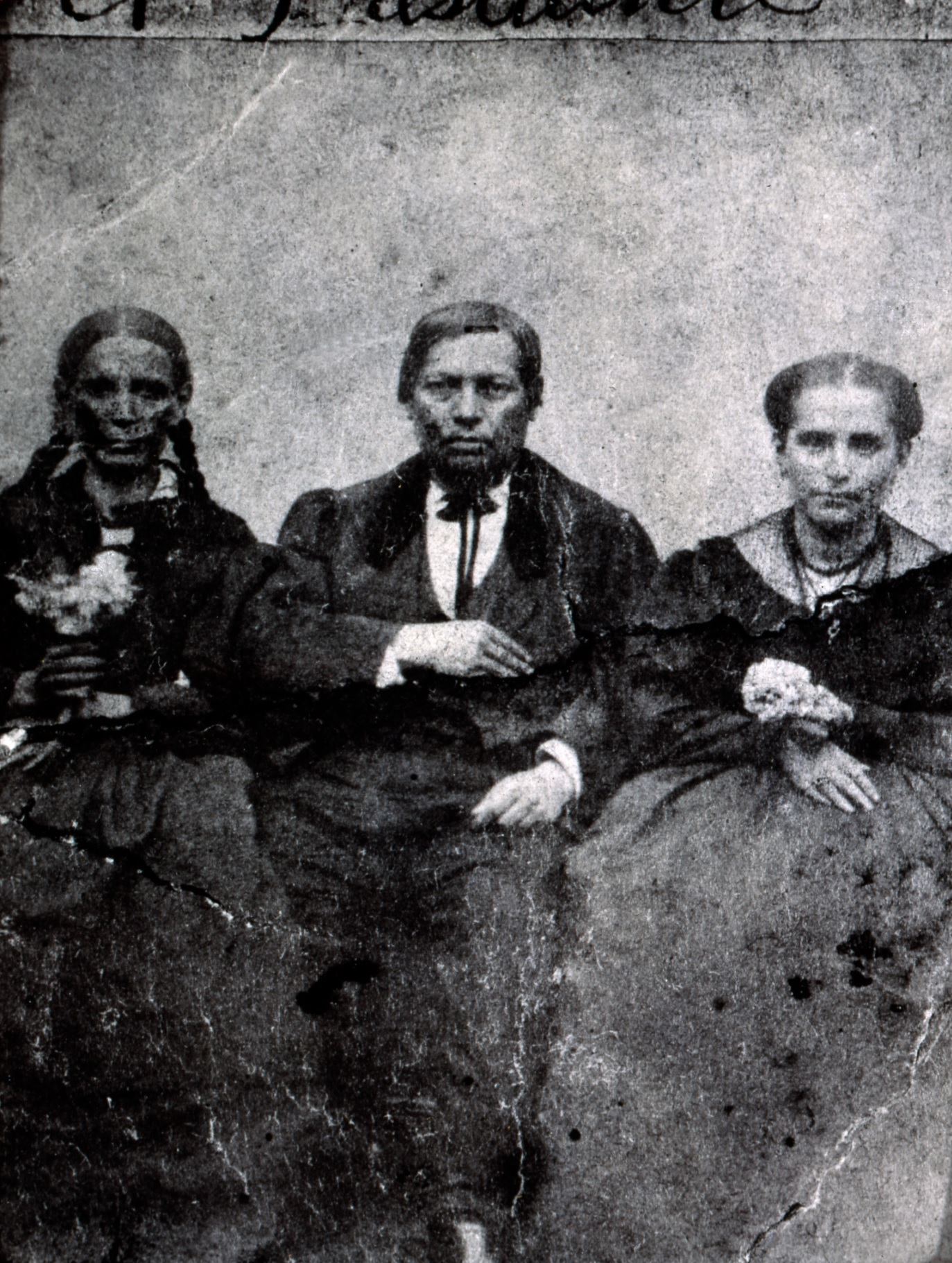
Juárez with his sister María Josefa (with braids) (left) and wife Margarita Maza, on the day of their marriage in 1843. Juárez was the first Mexican president to have been extensively photographed. This picture was taken just three years after photography was introduced to Mexico.

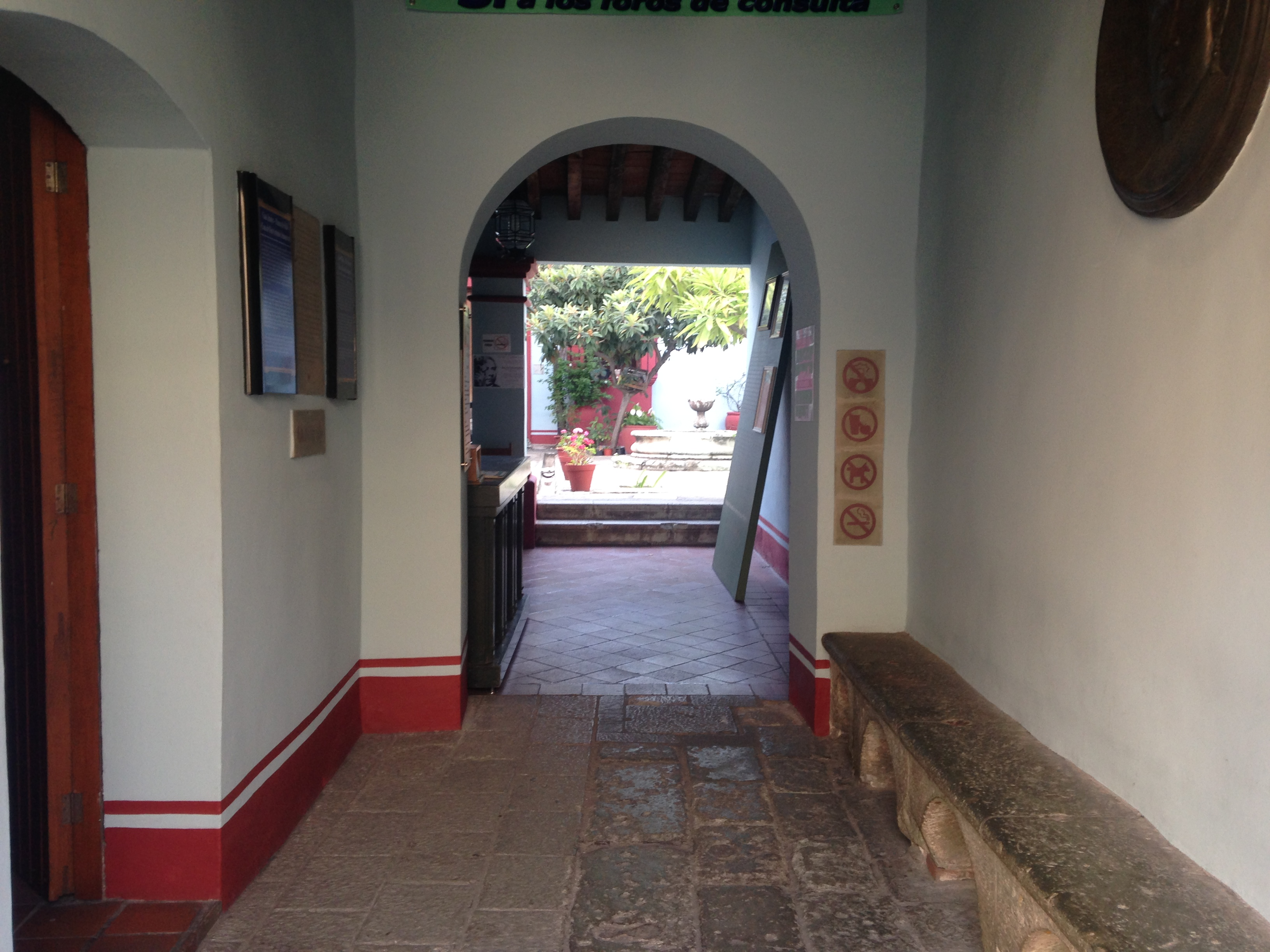
The Maza residence in Oaxaca City, where Juárez worked as a youth, is now known as Casa de Juárez and preserved as a museum.

Benito Juárez was born on 21 March 1806, in the village of San Pablo Guelatao, Oaxaca, New Spain, located in the mountain range since named for him, the Sierra Juárez. It was a small settlement of about two hundred inhabitants, made up of straw huts, and a small church, the village being located at the edge of a mountain pond known for its picturesque transparent waters and called La Laguna Encantada, the enchanted pond.

His parents, Brígida García and Marcelino Juárez, were Zapotec peasants. He described his parents as "Indians from the primitive race of the country" (Spanish: indios de la raza primitiva del país). He had two older sisters, Josefa and Rosa. Juárez became an orphan at the age of 3. His grandparents also died shortly after, and Juárez was raised by his uncle Bernardino Juárez.

Juárez worked in the cornfields and as a shepherd until the age of 12. Up until then Juárez had also been illiterate and could not speak Spanish, knowing then only his first language, Zapotec (specifically, Ixtlan Zapotec). However, his sister had previously moved to the city of Oaxaca for work, and that year Juárez moved to the city to attend school. There he took a job as a domestic servant in the household of Antonio Maza, where his sister worked as a cook.

In 1818, while the Mexican War of Independence was ongoing, a 12-year-old Juárez entered domestic service under the lay Franciscan and bookbinder Antonio Salanueva. The young boy showed potential at primary school, upon which Salanueva sought to sponsor Juárez to enter a seminary to study for the priesthood.

Juárez entered the seminary in the Spring of 1821, only a few months before Mexico won its independence in September of the same year. He continued his theological studies for six years but eventually decided that he was not interested in the priesthood. An Institute of Arts and Sciences had been founded by the Oaxacan state legislature in 1826, and Juárez transferred there in 1827. In 1829, Juárez was appointed a teacher of physics. In 1831, Juárez accepted the post of Regidor del Ayuntamiento, or judicial secretary to the municipal council of Oaxaca City. In 1832, he graduated from the Institute of Arts and Sciences with a law degree. He was eventually admitted to the bar on 13 January 1834.

== Early political career ==
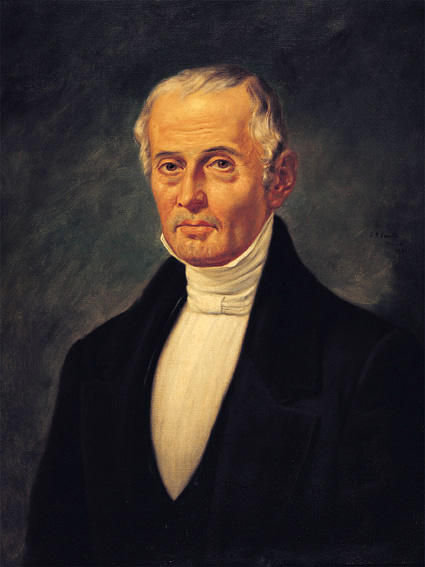
Early in his career, Juárez supported president Valentín Gómez Farías who attempted to carry out many of the reforms Juárez would eventually pass.

=== Legal career ===
From the very beginning of his legal career, Juárez became an active partisan of the Liberal Party. As a lawyer, Juárez took cases of Indigenous villagers. Community members of Loxicha, Oaxaca hired him for their denunciation of a priest, whom they accused of abuses. He did not win the case, and was thrown into jail along with community members, "thanks to the collusion between Church and the state," writing later that it "strengthened in me the goal of working constantly to destroy the pernicious power of the privileged classes." Juárez took on the goal of fighting for equality before the law in the face of the lingering legal privileges that remained in Mexico from the colonial legal system, as were accorded to the Mexican Catholic Church, the army, and Indigenous communities. He became a prosecutor for the State of Oaxaca and was soon elected to the Oaxaca state legislature in 1832, serving for two years during the Liberal presidency of Valentín Gómez Farías.

A Conservative Party coup led by Santa Anna overthrew the presidency of Gomez Farias in 1834. As part of the constitutional reorganization involved in the subsequent transition from the First Mexican Republic to the Centralist Republic of Mexico, Oaxaca became a department controlled by Mexico City and the state legislature of Oaxaca was dissolved. Juárez protested the dissolution of local government that was being imposed upon Oaxaca and, in fact, the rest of Mexico, as part of the transition to the Centralist Republic of Mexico in which the states of the nation were replaced by departments directly administered by Mexico City. For this, Juárez was briefly imprisoned, but he was shortly released. Juárez then returned to private practice. After practicing law for several years, in 1842 the Liberal governor of Oaxaca, Antonio León, appointed Juárez to serve as a Civil and Revenue Judge for the state of Oaxaca, a position which he held until 1846.

=== Governor of Oaxaca ===
The Centralist Republic itself would be overthrown in 1846 at the beginning of the Mexican American War and Oaxaca regained its federal autonomy, its executive now led by a triumvirate which included Juárez. He was subsequently elected to the national congress as a deputy for Oaxaca. Juárez supported President Farías, who had returned to power. There was a revolt against the state of Oaxaca during this time, causing Juárez to abandon his congressional post and return to Oaxaca to try to maintain order.

In November 1847, he assumed the governorship. When Santa Anna, disgraced by his loss in the Mexican-American War, fell from power, Governor Juárez did not allow the ex-president to establish himself in Oaxaca, which gained for him the future enmity of Santa Anna. Juárez was faced with chaos in the state finances, the state justice department, and the state police organization. Juárez proceeded to carry out a program of economic improvements which included an elimination of the state deficit, the construction of roads and bridges, and the development of education. Governor Juárez also prepared and published a Civil and Penal Code. Oaxaca became a model state, and Juárez gained fame throughout the nation as an able administrator.

Upon finishing his one term permitted by the state constitution, Juárez became the director of the Oaxaca Institute of Science and Arts, where he had previously studied law and also taught science. Juárez also continued his practice of law.

=== Exile in New Orleans ===
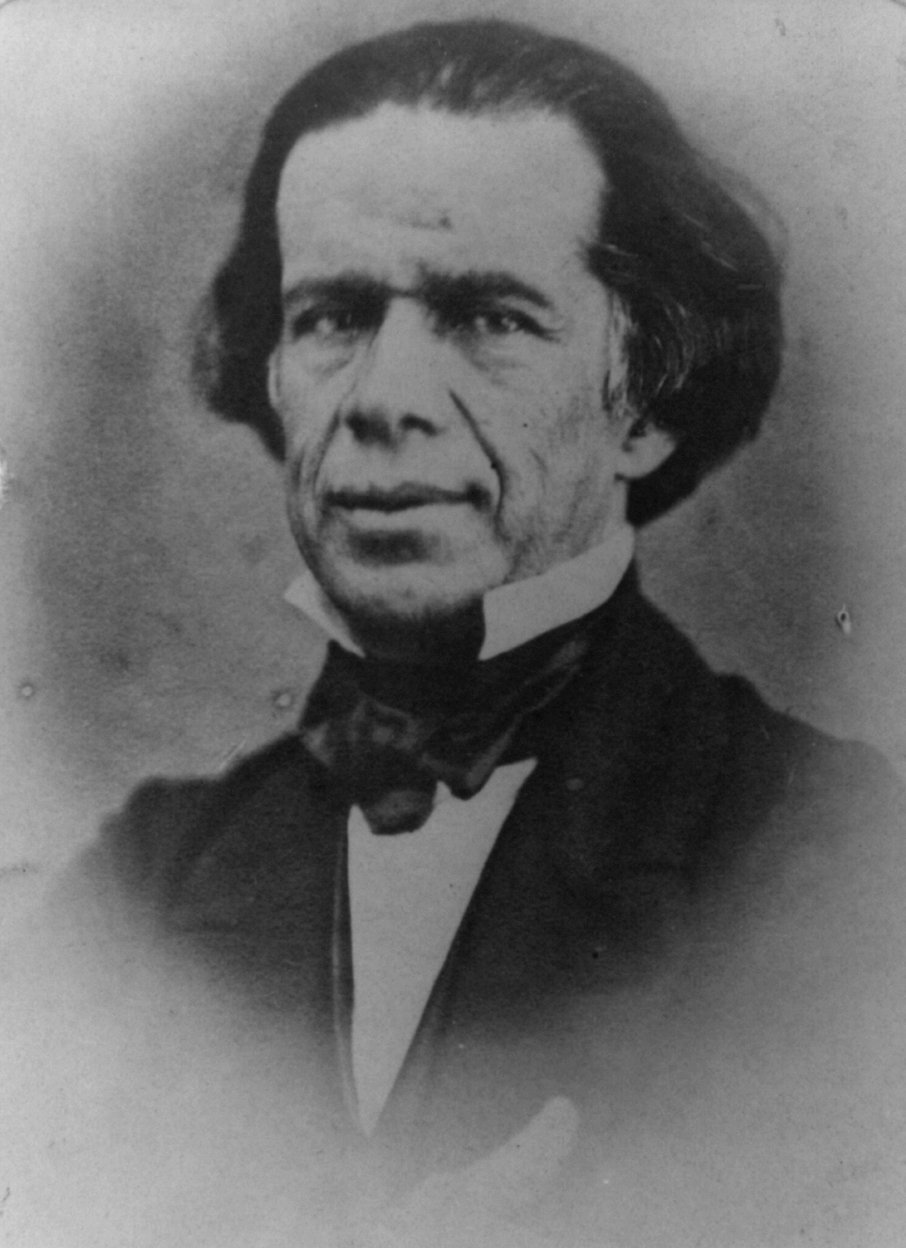
Melchor Ocampo, a radical Liberal whom Juárez met in their New Orleans exile

Mexico experienced relative peace and stability in the years immediately following the conclusion of the Mexican-American War, through the moderate presidencies of José Joaquín de Herrera and Mariano Arista, but in 1852 a Conservative coup overthrew Arista, and brought back Santa Anna for what would end up being his final dictatorship.

Juárez fell victim to the restored Santa Anna, and the authorities confined him to the fortress of San Juan de Ullua. He was eventually released and exiled to Havana, from which he then traveled to New Orleans. There he found a day job as a cigar maker in one of the city's factories, while his wife remained in Mexico with their children, and were looked after by Liberal partisans. His time as governor of Oaxaca had not left him with a vast fortune, and he survived off of his cigar rolling job and funds sent to him from Mexico by his wife.

Juárez met other Liberal exiles in New Orleans, including the anti-clerical former governor of Michoacan Melchor Ocampo, and the Cuban separatist exile, Pedro Santacicilia, who later married Juárez's oldest daughter, and served as a valuable ally during the Reform War and the second French intervention

As a revolt against Santa Anna inspired by the Liberal Plan of Ayutla broke out in March 1855, Juárez sought to return to Mexico. He arrived at the port of Acapulco near the Southern center of the revolt in the summer of 1855. Santa Anna fled the nation and a subsequent Liberal assembly elected Juan Alvarez as the new president. Juárez, who had been secretary to the assembly, was made Minister of Justice and Religion.

=== La Reforma ===
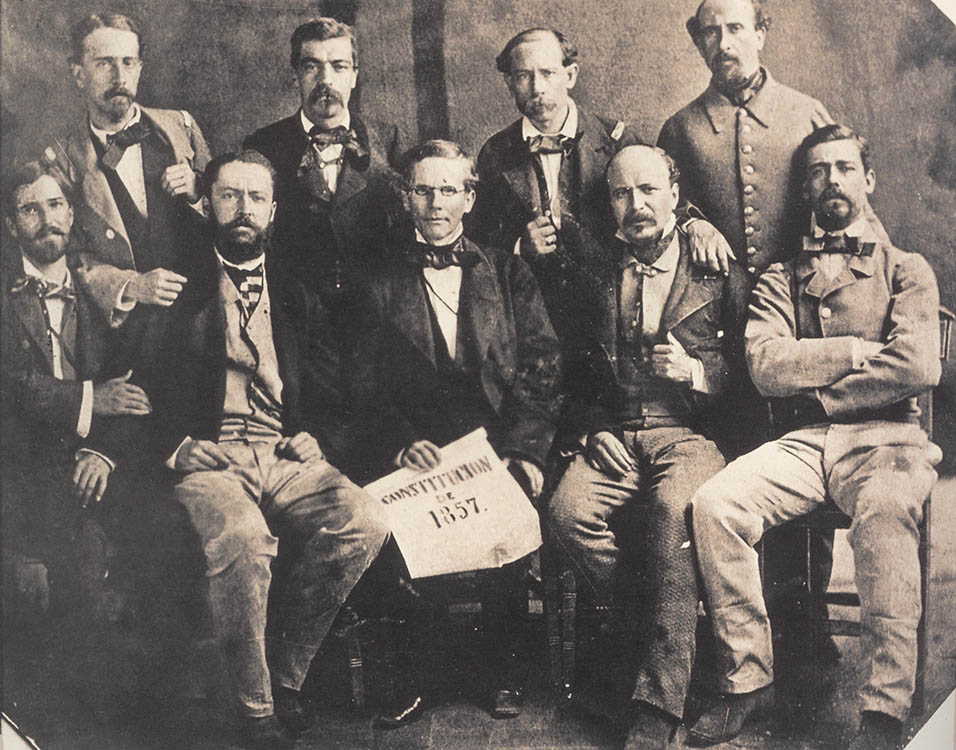
Liberals posing with a copy of the Constitution of 1857.

The Plan of Ayutla had inaugurated what would come to be known as La Reforma, a period of unprecedented constitutional change for Mexico, and Juárez was to be a key figure throughout this era. Before La Reforma, and dating back to the legal system of New Spain, neither clerics nor soldiers were under the jurisdiction of the civil judiciary, and could only be tried for all offenses under their own respective, independent court systems.

It was the aim of the Liberal Party to abolish all such sovereign court systems and bring all offenses under the jurisdiction of the state. This was done through the Ley Juárez, named for the Minister of Justice, and promulgated under the presidency of Alvarez. The law would remain on the books, but President Alvarez resigned in December 1855 amid increasing opposition to his administration, passing over the presidency to the more moderate Liberal Ignacio Comonfort, who it was hoped could more effectively pass progressive reforms.

Juárez did not continue as Minister of Justice, and spent the pivotal year of 1856 peacefully retired in Oaxaca, although continuing to correspond with his Liberal allies in Mexico City as they continued their aims in furthering La Reforma. Juárez personally lobbied for a measure expelling the Jesuits from Mexico which was passed in June 1856. Meanwhile, the Mexican Congress was drafting a new Constitution which integrated into itself the Ley Juárez along with the Ley Lerdo, which had nationalized most of the Catholic Church's properties, along with the communal properties of Mexico's Indigenous communities, with the aim of selling them off to stimulate economic development. The new constitution, which would come to be known as the Constitution of 1857, was promulgated on 5 February 1857, with the aim of coming into effect on Mexican Independence Day, 16 September of that year. It had abandoned Roman Catholicism as the state religion, and aimed to establish religious freedom, freedom of association, civil rights, the abolition of monopolies, and the abolition of hereditary privileges.

As opposition to the Constitution of 1857 threatened civil war, Comonfort's ministers resigned on 20 October 1857. Among the replacements was Juárez, who was appointed as Secretary of Home Affairs (Secretario de Gobernacion), and was made Chairman of the Council of Ministers. When, one month later, Comonfort was formally elected as the first president under the new constitution, Juárez was appointed Chief Justice of the Supreme Court.

== Reform War ==
=== Flight from the capital ===
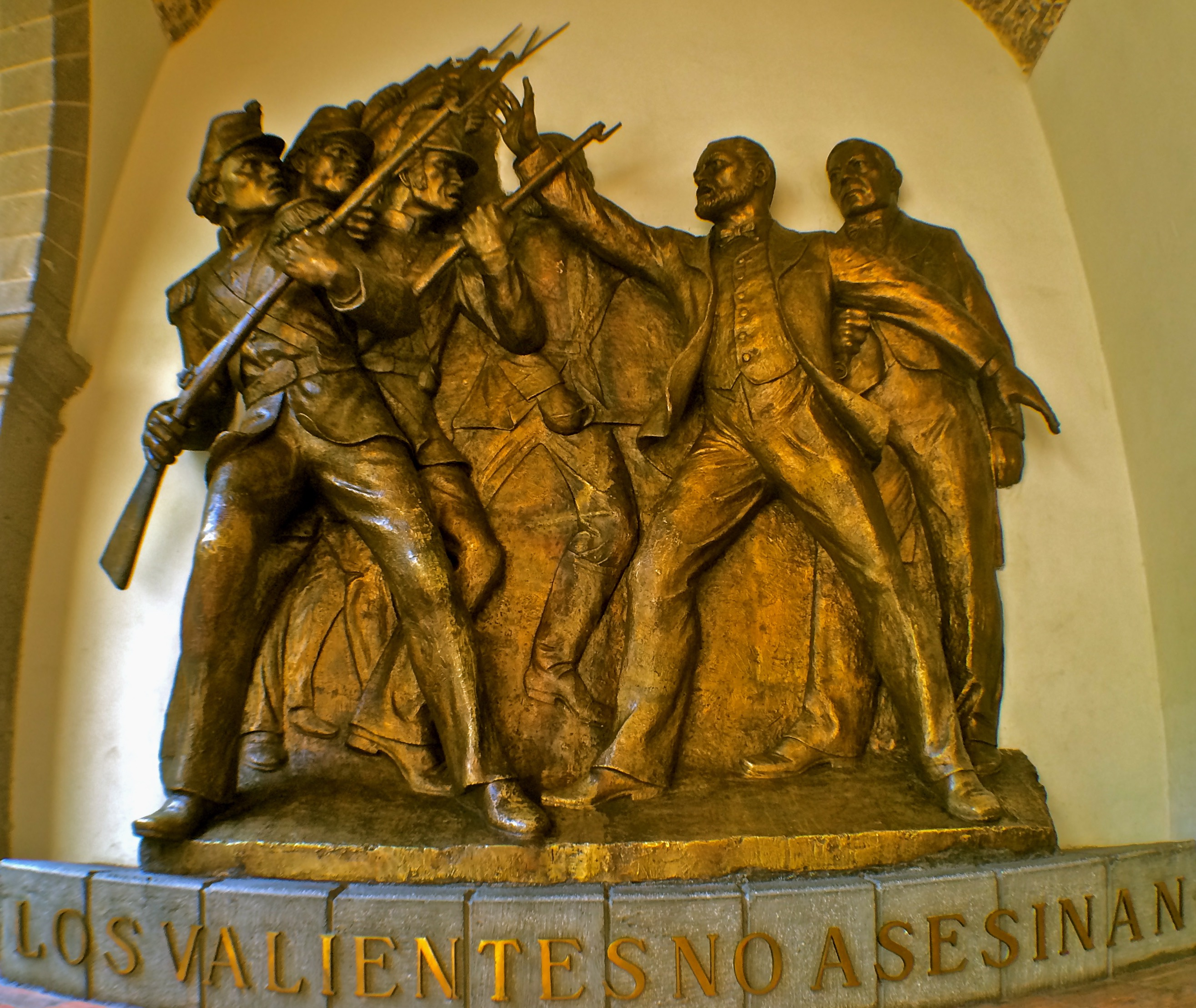
Juárez was saved by Guillermo Prieto from execution by Conservative troops on 13 March 1858 in Guadalajara.

In the face of increasing opposition however and with civil conflict already erupting in the state of Puebla, the moderate President Comonfort sought to distance himself from the Constitution of 1857 and by December was already announcing that the Constitution ought to be reformed. Chief Justice Juárez rebuffed Comonfort's invitation to join him in abandoning the constitution. On 17 December, Conservatives led by Felix Zuloaga proclaimed the Plan of Tacubaya, which dissolved congress and invited Comonfort to accept the presidency with extraordinary powers in a self-coup. Comonfort "felt that by temporarily assuming dictatorial powers he could hold the extremists on both sides in check and pursue a middle course, always his object. It soon became obvious that such an assumption was merely wishful thinking." Comonfort accepted and had Juárez imprisoned in the capital.

Comonfort however had blundered in overestimating the support he could expect among the state governors. The strategic port state of Veracruz disowned the Plan of Tacubaya, and Comonfort realized that the country had begun to fragment into civil war. This was much more than he had intended, and he began to back away from the Conservatives. Juárez was released from prison on 11 January 1858, shortly before Comonfort himself left the country, the presidency thus passing over to Juárez who as Chief Justice was next in line to succeed to the presidency. Meanwhile, the Conservatives elected Zuloaga as their president.

As Mexico City fell into the hands of the Conservatives, President Juárez transferred himself to Guanajuato City, where on 19 January, he assembled his cabinet and vowed to defend the Constitution through war if necessary. The states of Tamaulipas, Sinaloa, Durango, Jalisco, Tabasco, San Luis Potosi, Oaxaca, Guanajuato, and Veracruz proclaimed their loyalty to the Juárez government.

The first year of the Reform War, as it would come to be known, was marked by repeated Conservative victories, albeit indecisive ones. On 10 March 1858, the Liberals lost the Battle of Salamanca, near Juárez's base in Guanajuato City, after which he and his government retreated to Guadalajara. While the Liberal government was ensconced there, the garrison mutinied against them, and Juárez was imprisoned along with his ministers, who included Melchor Ocampo and Guillermo Prieto. The commander of the garrison, Colonel Landa, was far from having effective control over the entire city. Landa offered Juárez his liberty if he would order the remaining Liberal troops in Guadalajara to surrender. Juárez refused and Landa responded by ordering his troops to shoot the prisoners.

Guillermo Prieto intervened and the soldiers hesitated. Landa did not repeat his orders, and it was at this point that a Liberal body of troops under Miguel Cruz de Aedo arrived in order to negotiate. Landa was allowed to leave Guadalajara, and the Liberal prisoners were released as well.

Juárez was the first sitting Mexican ruler to leave the national territory. This occurred between 11 April and 4 May 1858. He and his cabinet departed from the port of Manzanillo bound for the Liberal stronghold of Veracruz by way of Panama City (then part of the Republic of New Granada), arriving on 18 April. On 19 April he departed for Havana (capital of the then Province of Cuba, still part of the Spanish Empire), arriving on 22 April. Three days later he embarked for New Orleans, United States, arriving on 28 April. Finally, he departed on 1 May and returned to Veracruz, arriving definitively on 4 May. Upon his arrival Juárez was joined by his wife and greeted with enthusiasm by the population. In Veracruz, the government of Manuel Gutiérrez Zamora was stationed with General Ignacio de la Llave. However, this was not an official trip; rather, it was the flight of the authorities recognized by the liberals in the context of the Reform War. The president had been in constant movement since the beginning of the conflict, and was forced to leave the country for two strategic reasons: the advance of conservative troops on Guadalajara (where his government had been based), and the need to take control of the port of Veracruz, the country's main supply port and key to defeating the conservatives. Unable to proceed overland, he had to travel by sea through the three aforementioned stops.

=== Veracruz ===
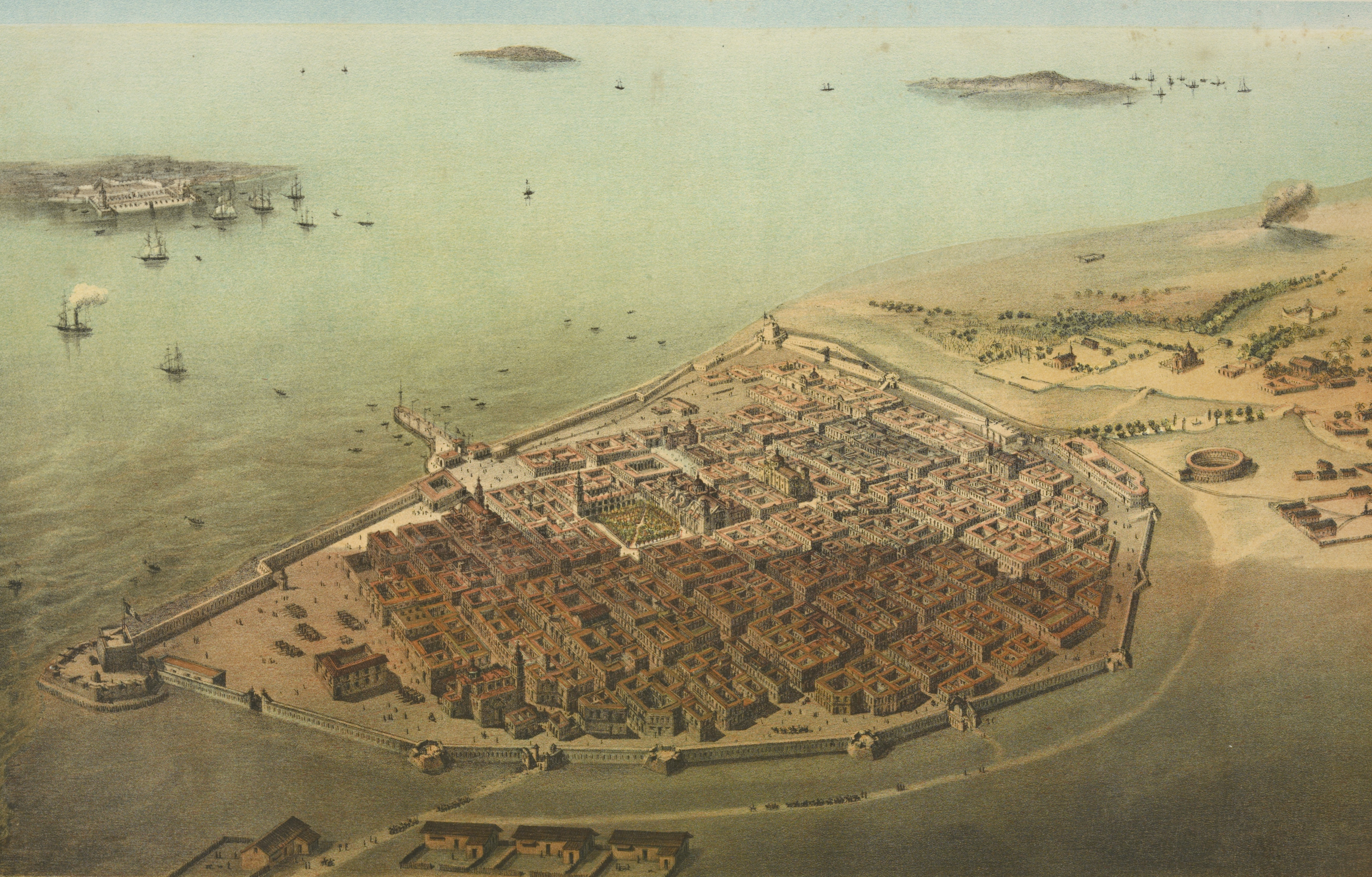
The Atlantic Port of Veracruz would serve as the Liberal capital during the Reform War.

One of Juárez's first challenges in the new capital was meeting French and English claims over loans that had been forced upon English and French merchants by the Liberal General Garza. Juárez warded off the threat of military intervention by recognizing the legitimacy of the claims.

The Conservatives meanwhile were suffering from infighting and, after a series of victories, General Miguel Miramon became the new Conservative president in December 1858. President Miramon gathered an army and prepared a siege of Veracruz.

On 29 December 1858, President Juárez called upon the inhabitants of Veracruz to prepare for an attack by collecting arms, provisions, and organizing fortifications. The first Conservative siege of Veracruz failed in March 1859.

Meanwhile, the Liberal armies were making advances upon Mexico City. General Degollado occupied the suburbs of Mexico City throughout February and March 1859, only to be repulsed by the efforts of the Conservative General Marquez, who then gained infamy for shooting all of his prisoners of war in the suburb of Tacubaya.

Juárez remained entrenched in Veracruz. In the course of the war through 1859, the Liberals captured Mazatlan and Colima. By April, the United States had recognized the Liberal government as the legitimate government of Mexico and sent Robert Milligan McLane as its official representative.

On 7 July 1859, Juárez laid out an agenda of legislation decreeing the de jure separation of church and state, the greater independence of the judiciary, the expansion of affordable education, a program of road construction, a program of railroad construction, financial reform, the reduction of duties, the encouragement of foreign commerce, the subdivision of great estates to encourage peasant proprietorship, and the encouragement of immigration.

On 12 July, a series of anti-clerical laws were passed adding upon those that had already been implemented as part of the Constitution of 1857. The properties of the Catholic Church were almost entirely nationalized, the responsibility of carrying out marriages was completely removed from the Catholic Church and was declared to be a purely civil contract, and the registration of births and deaths was also removed from the Church and handed over to the state. Furthermore, monasteries were dissolved although nunneries were allowed to remain with the condition that they accept no more novices.

=== McLane-Ocampo Treaty ===
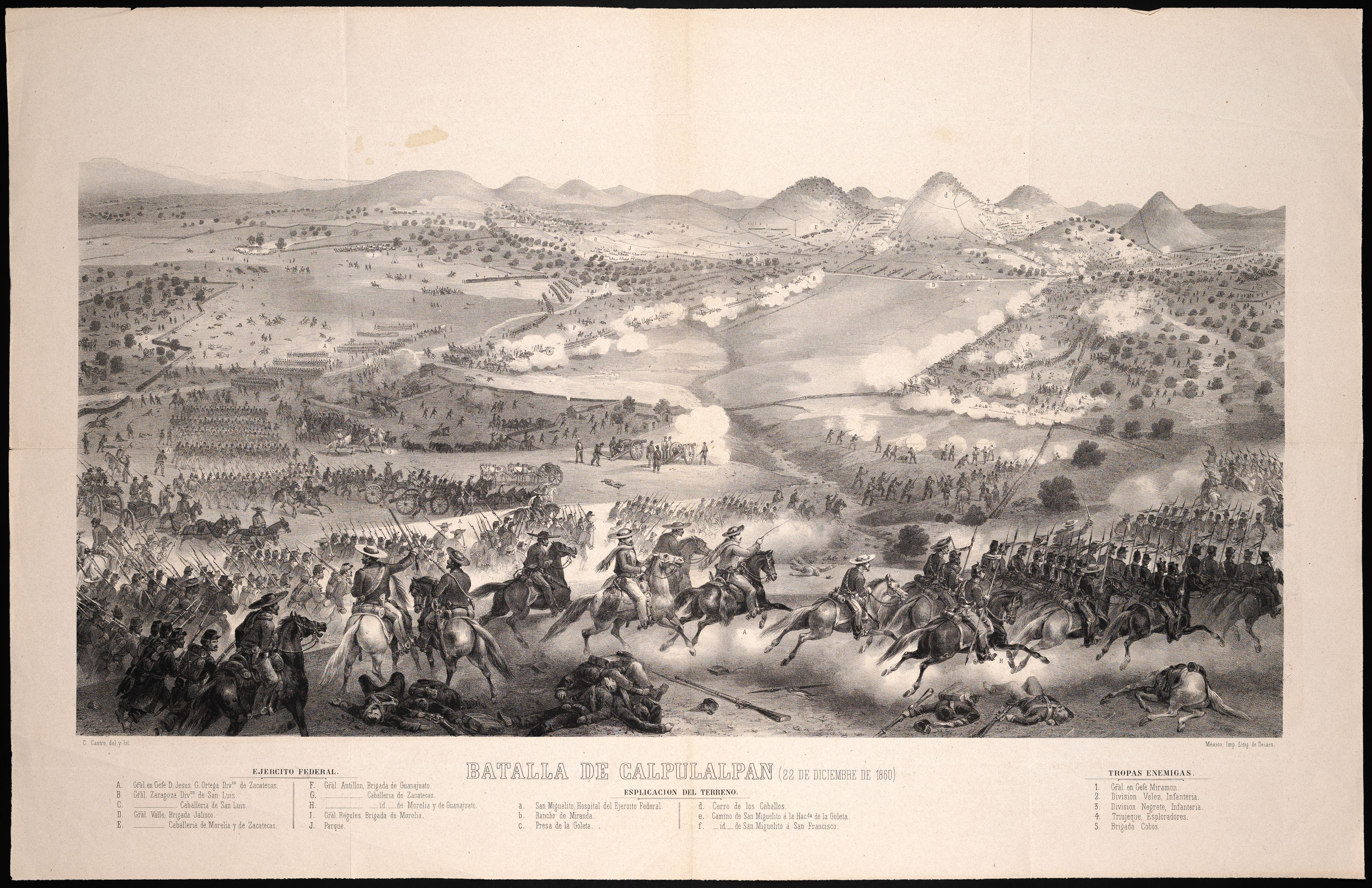
The Battle of Calpulalpan which decisively ended the Reform War in favor of the Liberals.

The U.S. at this time was seeking a route for transit from the Caribbean to the Pacific Ocean, and the Isthmus of Tehuantepec was the narrowest crossing in Mexico between the bodies of water. Juárez, needing allies against the Conservatives, and his government proceeded to negotiate the McLane-Ocampo Treaty by December 1859. The treaty would have granted the United States perpetual extraterritorial rights for its citizens and its military through key strategic routes in Mexico. The treaty however, ultimately was rejected by the United States Senate.

The American recognition of the Juárez government at Veracruz also led the United States to defend it against another one of Miramon's siege attempts. Towards the end of 1859, the Conservative government commissioned two gun boats to depart from Cuba and attack Veracruz while Miramon attacked from the land, but they were seized by the U.S. Navy as pirates.

=== Liberal victory ===
The year 1860 was one of increasing Liberal victories and Miramon once again indecisively attacked Veracruz in March. In September, the Juárez government suffered a scandal when the Liberal General Santos Degollado raided a mule train of money being sent to European merchants. Juárez made efforts to recover the money and gave orders for restitution.

As an inevitable Liberal victory approached, Juárez issued a decree on 6 November 1860, fixing the date of presidential and congressional elections for the following January, with the newly elected congress scheduled to meet on 19 February.

After Guadalajara was captured on 20 December 1860, the Liberal armies had an unrestricted path back towards Mexico City. Liberal troops entered the capital on Christmas Day 1860 without encountering any military Conservative resistance.

== Interbellum presidency ==
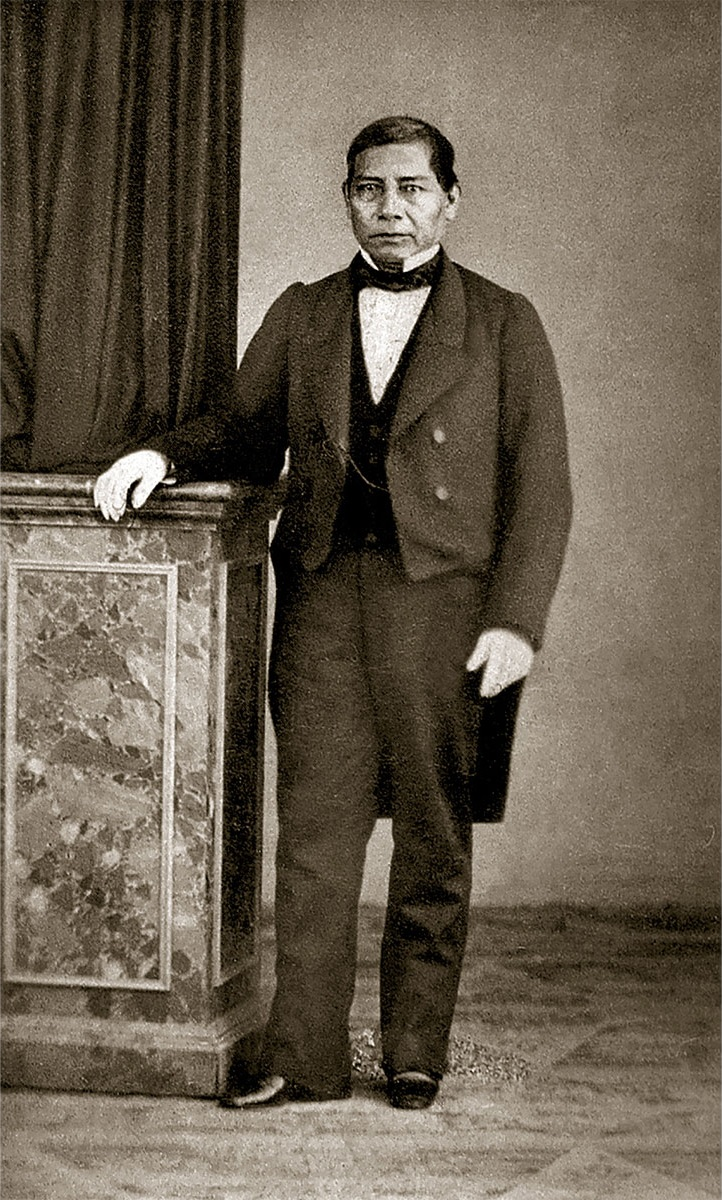
Full-length photo of Juárez, c.1860

Juárez won the elections of 1861 with a large majority over his only rival General Jesús González Ortega. Juárez passed an amnesty towards the Conservatives who had fought against him during the Reform War with certain exceptions including leading generals and clergy.

The former Conservative president Miramon had fled the country, but certain Conservative generals, including Leonardo Marquez and Tomás Mejía Camacho, remained at large in the countryside. Melchor Ocampo, one of the leading Liberals during the Reform War, was assassinated by Marquez on 17 June 1861. Ocampo's assassination led to severe outrage in the capital. Many Conservatives were arrested and faced deadly retaliation, but Juárez intervened on their behalf.

Santos Degollado, who had been dismissed from his military command, requested permission from congress to pursue Ocampo's killers. He too was killed by the guerrillas on 15 June, and his command was handed over to González Ortega. Conservative General Leonardo Márquez took refuge in the Sierra Gorda of Querétaro.

In the wake of the Reform War and the demobilization of combatants, Juárez established the Rural Guard or Rurales, aimed at enforcing public security, particularly as banditry and rural unrest grew. Many brigands and bandits had allied themselves with the Liberals during the Reform War and returned to banditry after the war's end.

The reconstruction of the country also involved a reorganization of finances, but for the time being the Mexican government found it impossible to meet its domestic and its foreign obligations. A British Minister Plenipotentiary, Sir Charles Wyke, was commissioned on 30 March 1861, to negotiate British claims while providing reassurance that the British government aimed to respect Mexican sovereignty and maintain cordial relations between both countries. On 27 May, Wyke met with the Mexican Minister of Foreign Affairs Zarco, with the latter attempting to convince Wyke of the impossibility for Mexico to meet its current foreign debts.

On 3 June, President Juárez issued a decree, under the authority of congress postponing all payments to foreign creditors for one year. Events were now set in motion which would culminate in the Second French Intervention in Mexico, and the failed efforts of the Second French Empire to overthrow the government of the Mexican Republic and impose a monarchy upon the nation.

The main French pretext for subsequently invading Mexico had been specifically the issue of the Jecker Bonds, a series of high interest loans which had been contracted through a Swiss banker named Jecker, by the Conservative government during the Reform War. When the government of Juárez refused to honor the debts contracted by the Conservative government, Jecker took his complaints to the government of France.

The issue of monarchy came about through the efforts of certain Mexican monarchist exiles acting independently of the Mexican government. Monarchism in Mexico had been reduced to irrelevance after the fall of the extremely short lived First Mexican Empire in 1823. When José María Gutiérrez de Estrada had attempted to revive the issue by proposing a monarchy for the country in 1840, he was driven out of the country by public outrage, which included condemnation from both the Liberal Party and the Conservative Party.

Rejected by his own country, Estrada sought support for his monarchical project abroad, gaining the aid of the Mexican diplomat José Manuel Hidalgo y Esnaurrízar, who personally knew Empress Eugenie of France, and had won her over to the idea of a Mexican monarchy as early as 1857 Eugenie was enthusiastic about the effort to establish a monarchy in Mexico, but Napoleon III was skeptical, afraid of offending the United States through the violation of the Monroe Doctrine. This concern was rendered null by the outbreak of the American Civil War in 1861, and President Juárez's 1861 decree suspending foreign debts, which gave France a pretext to send troops to Mexico. Napoleon III saw an advantage in establishing a client state on the American continent which could also serve as a buffer state to United States expansionism.

For the meantime, however, Napoleon III kept his full aims hidden. Negotiations with Wykes had broken down and the minister wrote back to London advocating that the British Navy make a show of force. London and Paris began to make arrangements over the matter, and soon invited the government of Spain, which had also been affected by the President Juárez's suspension of debts. On 31 October 1861, the Convention of London was signed between France, Great Britain, and Spain, formalizing plans to militarily intervene in Mexico for the purposes of arranging its debt payments.

== Second French intervention ==
=== First French advance ===
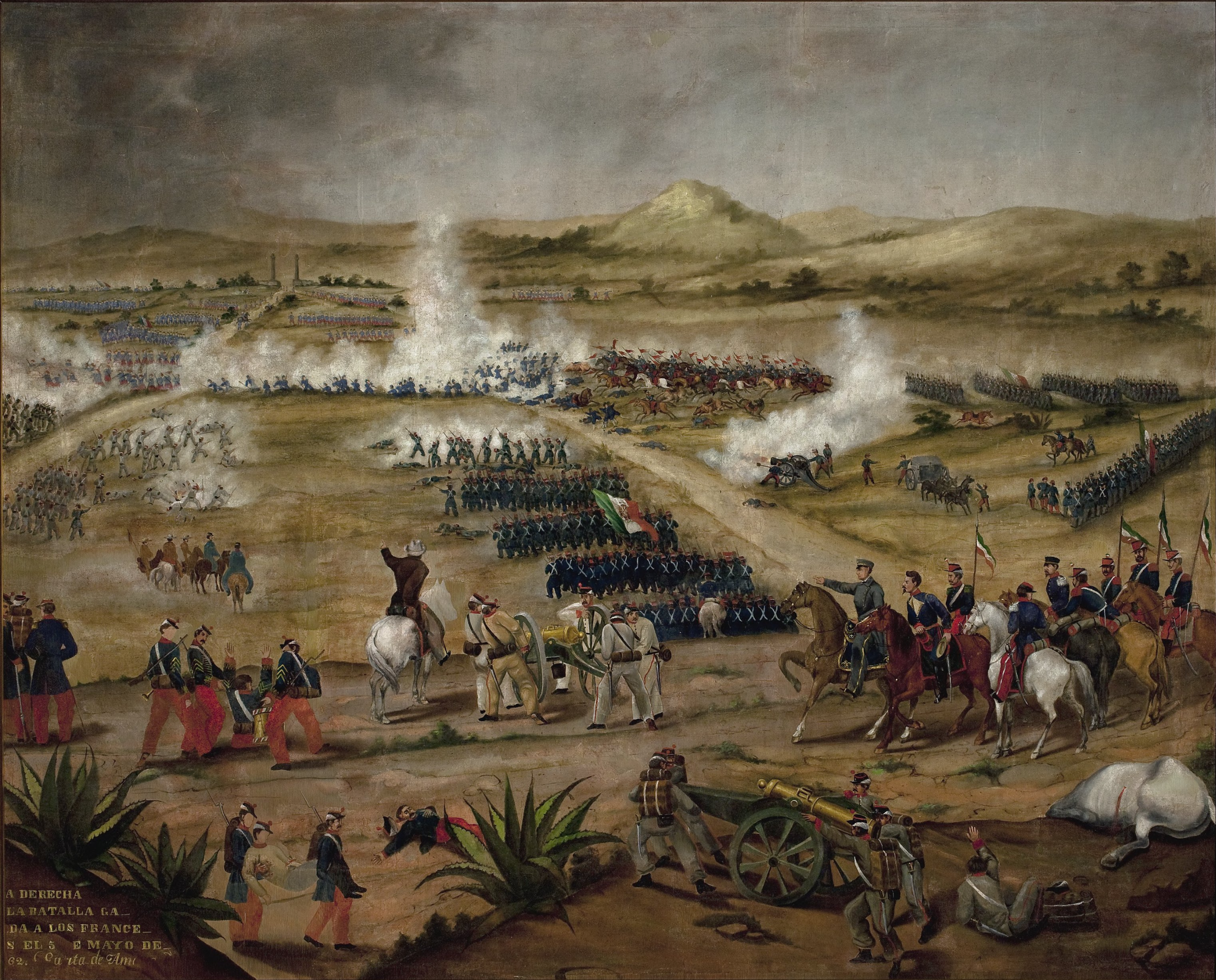
The French loss at the Battle of Puebla delayed the French advance into Mexico by a year.

Foreign Minister Manuel Doblado invited the commissioners to travel to Orizaba and there the three powers proceeded to officially recognize the government of Juárez along with Mexican sovereignty. On 9 April 1862, agreements at Orizaba between the allies broke down, as France made it increasingly clear that it intended to violate Mexican sovereignty in violation of previous agreements. The British informed the Mexican government that they now intended to exit the country, and an arrangement was made with the British government to settle its claims. Spain also agreed to evacuate the country.

Minister Doblado on 11 April 1862 made it known to the French government that its intentions were leading to war. Armed conflict finally broke out as French forces attempted to head for Mexico City. On 5 May 1862, Mexican forces commanded by Ignacio Zaragoza and future president of Mexico, Porfirio Díaz, repulsed the French while the latter were trying to ascend the hill towards the fortified positions of the city at the Battle of Puebla. The French retreated to Orizaba to await reinforcements. On 27 October 1862, congress granted President Juárez emergency powers to meet the needs of the ongoing invasion.

Meanwhile, the French increasingly gained the collaboration of Conservative Party generals who remained in the Mexican countryside in the wake of the Reform War. Monarchism had died out in Mexico by the time the French intervention began and the Conservative Party was initially reluctant to join the French in establishing a monarchy. The Spanish General Juan Prim, who had been part of the joint expedition would report to his government that there had been no monarchists in Mexico. The Conservatives would eventually be won over as they opportunistically sought the military aid to return themselves to power after their loss in the Reform War.

=== Fall of Mexico City ===
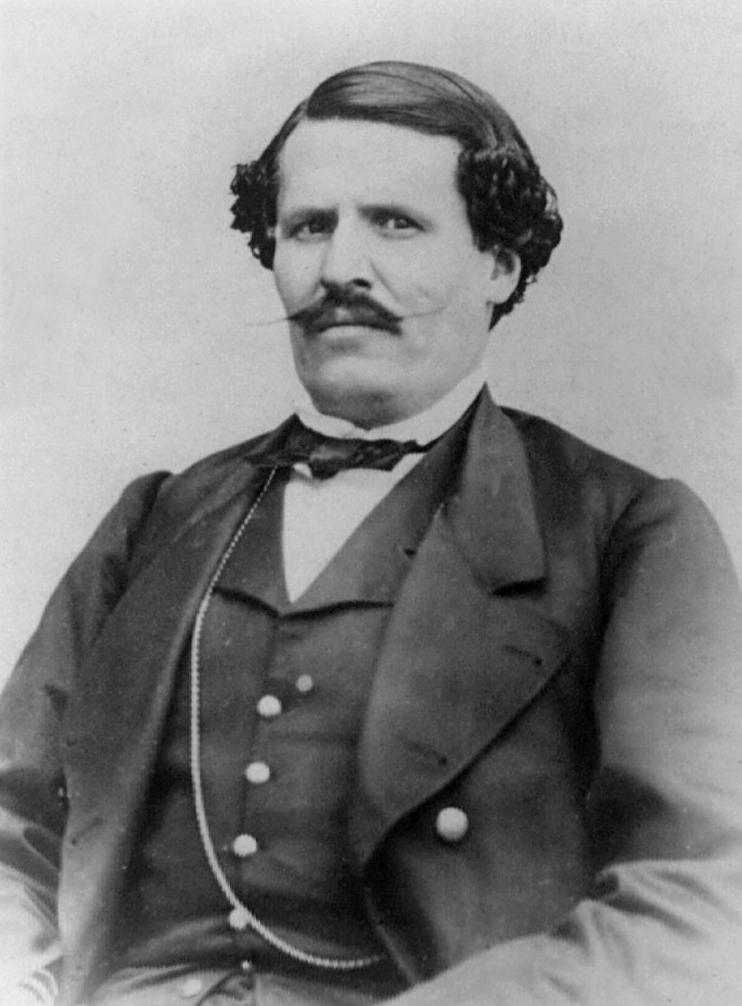
General and Governor Jesús González Ortega, key supporter and eventually rival of Juárez during the intervention.

Napoleon III sent reinforcements of 30,000 troops under the command of General Forey. Forey reached Orizaba on 24 October 1862, and began planning another siege of Puebla, the defense of which had now passed on to Jesús González Ortega after General Zaragoza had died of typhoid fever on 8 September. Mexican forces were forced to surrender on 17 May 1863.

Upon hearing of the fall of Puebla, President Juárez prepared to evacuate the capital and move the republican government to San Luis Potosi. Congress closed its session on 31 May, after once again granting President Juárez emergency powers. The French entered the capital on 10 June 1863.

The French established press censorship over all of the territory they controlled and also set up courts-martial staffed by French officers which were given authority over Mexicans. Dubois de Saligny, Napoleon's representative, selected and appointed a Junta Superior of collaborating Mexicans meant to serve as a puppet government to rubber-stamp French intentions of establishing a monarchy. Saligny and Forey themselves were present at the session of the so-called Assembly of Notables, whose motions had been prearranged by the French. On 8 July 1863, the Assembly resolved upon changing the nation into a monarchy, inviting Ferdinand Maximilian of Habsburg, to become Emperor of Mexico.

=== French advance in Central Mexico ===
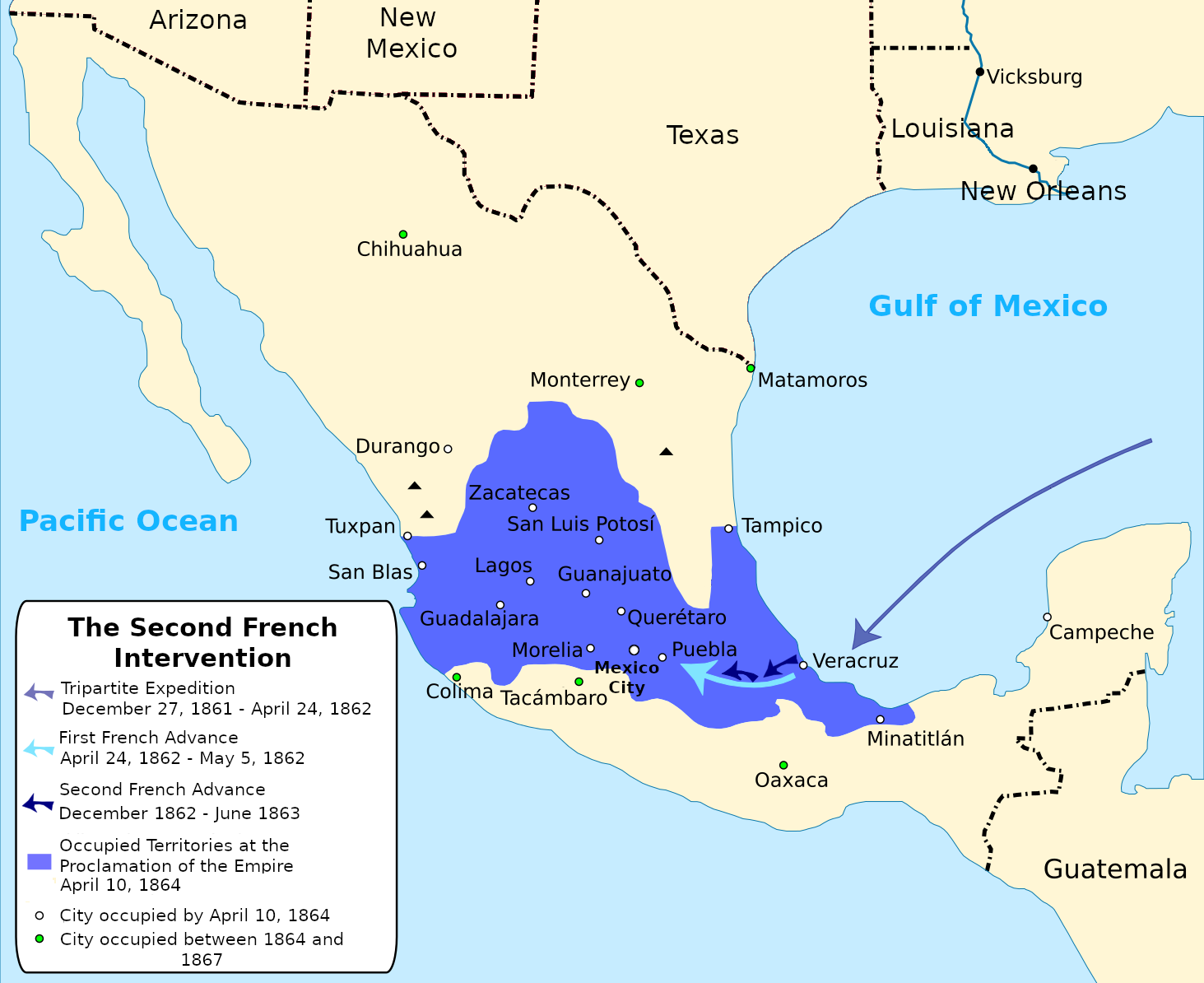
French controlled territories in 1864

On 9 June 1862, Juárez had arrived at San Luis Potosí and dispatches were sent to state governors in the parts of the country that were not yet occupied. French control continued to be centered upon Mexico City and Veracruz, although most major Mexican ports and their customs revenue had fallen into French hands. In August, Saligny and Forey were recalled to France, and command over French administration and the military of the conquered Mexican territories fell upon General François Achille Bazaine, already present in Mexico, who officially assumed his post on 1 October 1862.

Against the French, Juárez still commanded five divisions throughout the country, under ex president Ignacio Comonfort, who had been made Minister of War. Nonetheless, throughout the rest of the year, the French gradually expanded out of their main Mexico City -Veracruz corridor to eventually encompass much of central Mexico, while the commanders of the Republic began to wage a campaign of guerrilla warfare. Minister of War Comonfort was killed in an ambush on 14 November and was succeeded as Commander in Chief by General José López Uraga. By December, President Juárez was forced to evacuate San Luis Potosi to set up a new capital at Saltillo.

The ongoing Republican counterattack was generally a failure, except for the Southern campaign of Porfirio Díaz. With an army of 3000 men, he swept South through French lines and entrenched himself in the state of Oaxaca, becoming the military commander of all of Mexico south of the French controlled areas. From his base in Oaxaca he fought off French advances into Chiapas, and commanded incursions into the state of Vera Cruz. By January 1864, however, the French through a naval attack had made inroads into Yucatán, capturing the city of Campeche.

=== Escape to the north ===
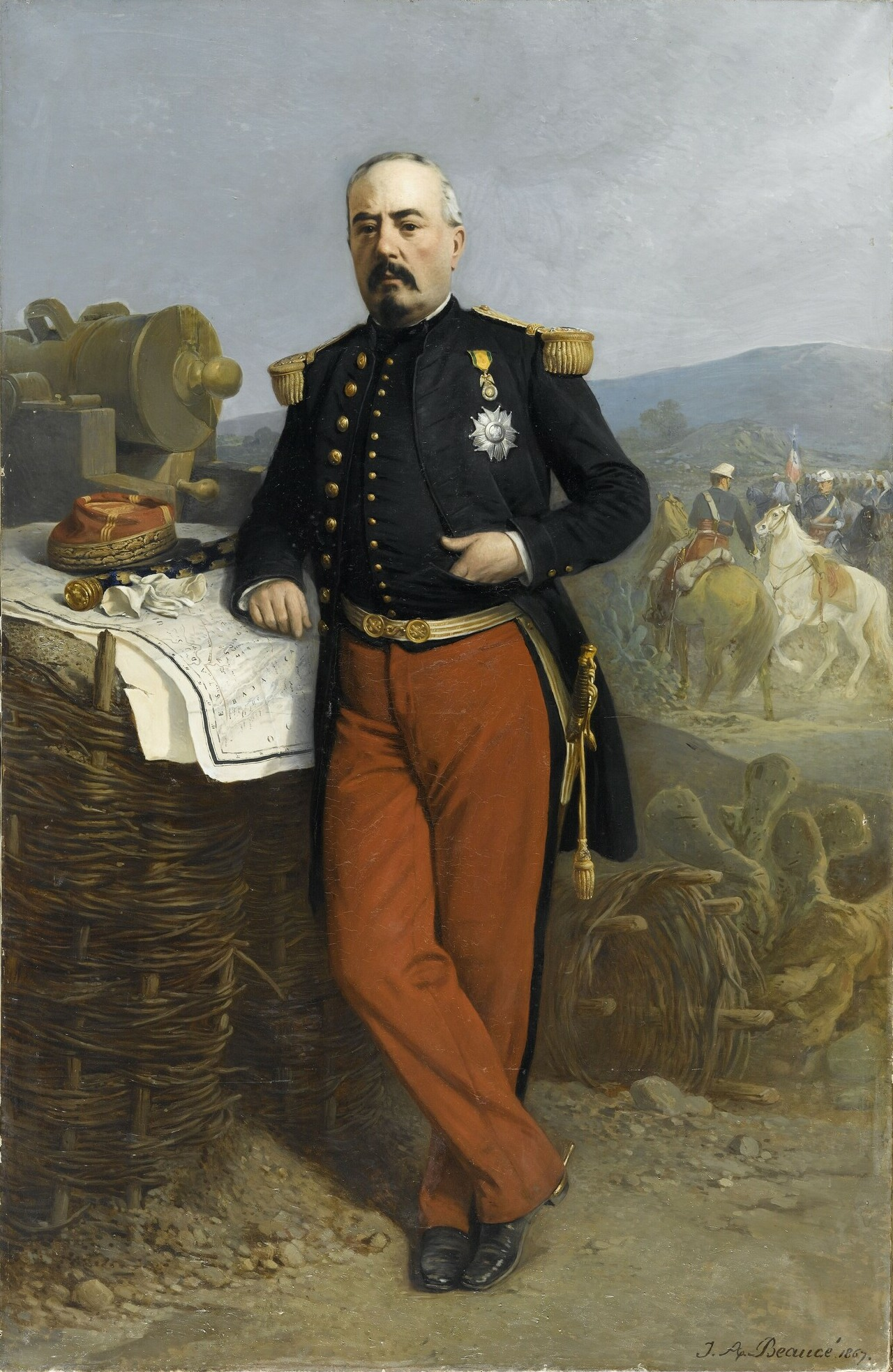
Marshal Bazaine would command the French intervention from 1863 up until the departure of the French in 1867.

In early 1864, Juárez faced opposition from Manuel Doblado and Jesús González Ortega, who accused him of taking autocratic actions that were against the constitution. Juárez defended himself by appealing to necessity, and the opposition was defused. On 29 March, Juárez established his new capital in Monterrey after having faced the mutiny of Governor Santiago Vidaurri, who had declared his loyalty to the French, but was then defeated by Republican forces and fled into Texas.

By May 1864, the Republican military situation in the north was weak, but Juárez still had 12,000 men under his command there, access to considerable customs revenue, and a steady flow of arms from the United States. The Mexican Republic still controlled the states of Sinaloa, Sonora, Durango, Chihuahua, Nuevo Leon and part of Tamaulipas. These territories included some rich mining districts, and two important custom-houses at Matamoros and Mazatlán. In the South, Díaz still controlled Guerrero, Oaxaca, Tabasco, and Chiapas.

Meanwhile, Maximilian from Miramare Castle had received the invitation from the Assembly of Notables, but put forth the condition that his rule first be ratified by a plebiscite. Bazaine carried out such a referendum in January 1864, through tactics such as the manipulation of returns along with the imprisonment of Mexican citizens who refused to accept Maximilian. Results showing overwhelming acceptance of Maximilian were sent by the French to Miramar, and Maximilian officially accepted the throne of the Mexican Empire on 10 April 1864, preparing then to depart for the country.

Maximilian signed arrangements with Napoleon, agreeing that Mexico should assume the cost for its own occupation, a measure which caused outrage in the Juárez government. Maximilian and his wife Charlotte, now Empress of Mexico finally arrived in Mexico City on 12 June 1864.

In July 1864, Commander in Chief Uraga was accused of corresponding with the French. In response, Juárez deposed him and replaced him with José María Arteaga, at which point Uraga defected to the French.

=== Juárez in El Paso del Norte ===
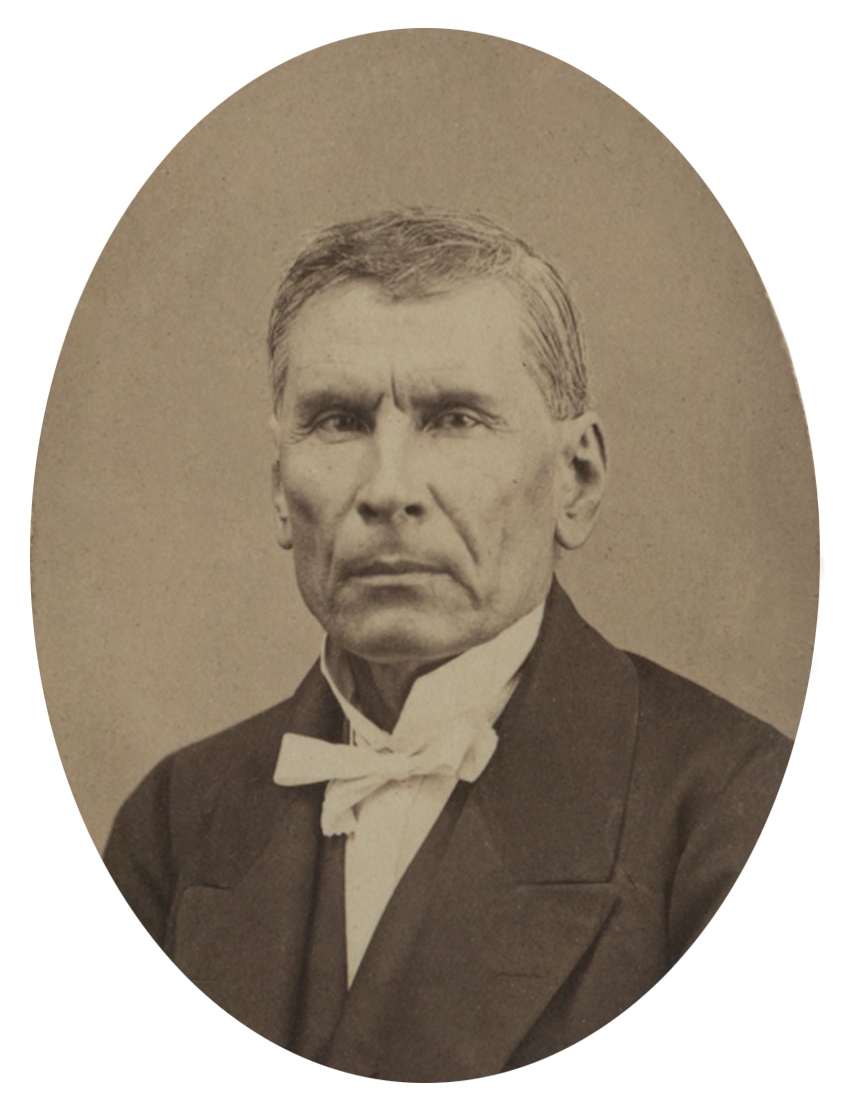
Northern Governor Santiago Vidaurri would defect to the French and nearly captured President Juárez in Monterrey. After the departure of the French, Vidaurri would find himself summarily executed by the Mexican government.

In August, Governor Vidaurri returned from Texas and launched an attack against Juárez, who narrowly escaped Monterrey in a bullet ridden carriage. President Juárez sent his family to New Orleans for their safety, while he then headed for the state of Chihuahua. He established a new capital in Chihuahua City in October 1864. By December, the French had seized the states of Nuevo Leon, Tamaulipas, and most of Coahuila.

General Ortega, ambitious for the presidency himself, challenged Juárez on constitutional grounds, claiming that Juárez's constitutional term had expired, but his efforts failed, as it was indicated to him that the expiration of the current presidential term would not actually occur for another year. Juárez proceeded to extend this own terms until elections could be held and Ortega retired to the United States. Juárez continued to suffer reverses in the North throughout the rest of the year, but in the South, Porfirio Díaz had managed to expel the French from Acapulco in December.

Díaz himself was captured after the French advanced upon Oaxaca City in February 1865and yet guerrilla warfare continued throughout the South. Díaz would escape French captivity after seven months, and almost immediately recaptured the state of Guerrero.

The approaching end of the American Civil War brought much hope to the Republican cause, and Juárez alluded to a future Union victory in order to inspire his partisans, for a victorious United States would be able to more strenuously oppose the Second French Intervention as a violation of the Monroe Doctrine. After the Civil War ended in April 1865, a concentration of American troops along the Rio Bravo caused Bazaine to send more of his troops to the north, resulting in an increase of Republican guerrilla activity in states such as Guanajuato and Michoacan. Some imperial prefects resigned for lack of troops, and Emperor Maximilian blamed Bazaine for the crisis.

In June, Franco-Imperial forces dispersed the main Republican army in the North under General Miguel Negrete. This inspired Maximilian to attempt to drive Juárez out of the country, hoping this would damage his cause in American public opinion before the next meeting of the United States Congress. Juárez was forced to evacuate Chihuahua City, but Bazaine did not pursue any further fearing a clash of French troops with American troops, and Juárez made his new capital in El Paso del Norte.

On 2 October 1865, acting upon the false intelligence that Juárez had left the country, Maximilian passed the so-called Black Decree, enacting summary execution for anyone now found waging guerrilla warfare. One of the victims of the decree would be commander in chief of the Mexican Republican forces, José María Arteaga.

=== Departure of the French ===
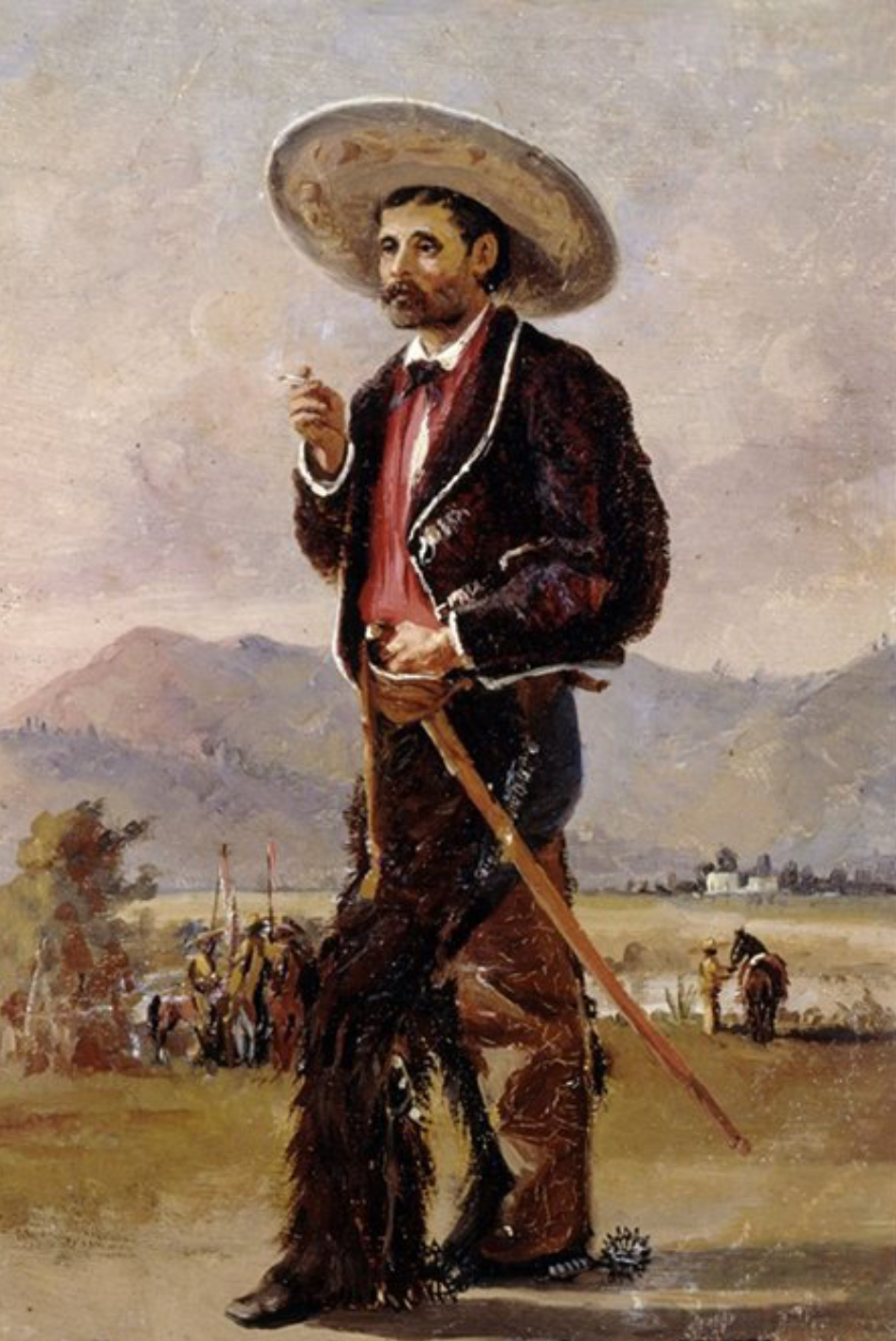
Charro Chinaco or a Mexican guerrilla fighter during the Intervention, wearing the red color of the Liberal Party.

On 1 October 1865, the Juárez government received a thirty million dollar loan from the United States. American volunteers also began to enlist in the army of the Mexican Republic.

On 30 November 1865, Juárez's term expired, and according to the Constitution, due to the inability of holding elections, the office of the president was to pass down to the Chief Justice of the Supreme Court, which was then Jesús González Ortega. A constitutional crisis ensued as the latter once more challenged Juárez for the office, but Juárez denied the validity of Ortega's claims, arguing that the relevant constitutional clause concerned itself with an interim presidency for the purpose of arranging new elections, which at the moment were impossible. Juárez passed a decree prolonging his own presidency and it was generally accepted among the Liberals.

Throughout late 1865, Napoleon III began to realize that the French troops were involved in a military quagmire. At the opening of the French Chambers in January 1866, he announced his intention of withdrawing French troops from Mexico. Faced with the impending collapse of the Empire, Empress Carlota traveled to Europe to seek more military support. Upon the failure of her efforts, she was reduced to insanity. Upon receiving news of his wife's failure and mental collapse Emperor Maximilian traveled to Orizaba in October 1866, and contemplated abdication.

The Second Mexican Empire was rapidly disintegrating in the wake of the departing French troops. By November 1866, the Juárez government had recovered most of the country, including nearly all of the territory encompassed by a line running from Tuxpan through San Luis Potosi, to Morelia, and nearly all of the territory south of Cuernavaca. Notwithstanding, Maximilian's privy council voted against abdication and Maximilian decided upon not departing with the French. The French representatives to Maximilian formally expressed their opposition to the decision, and warned Maximilian that the Empire could not sustain itself independently.

=== Execution of Maximilian ===
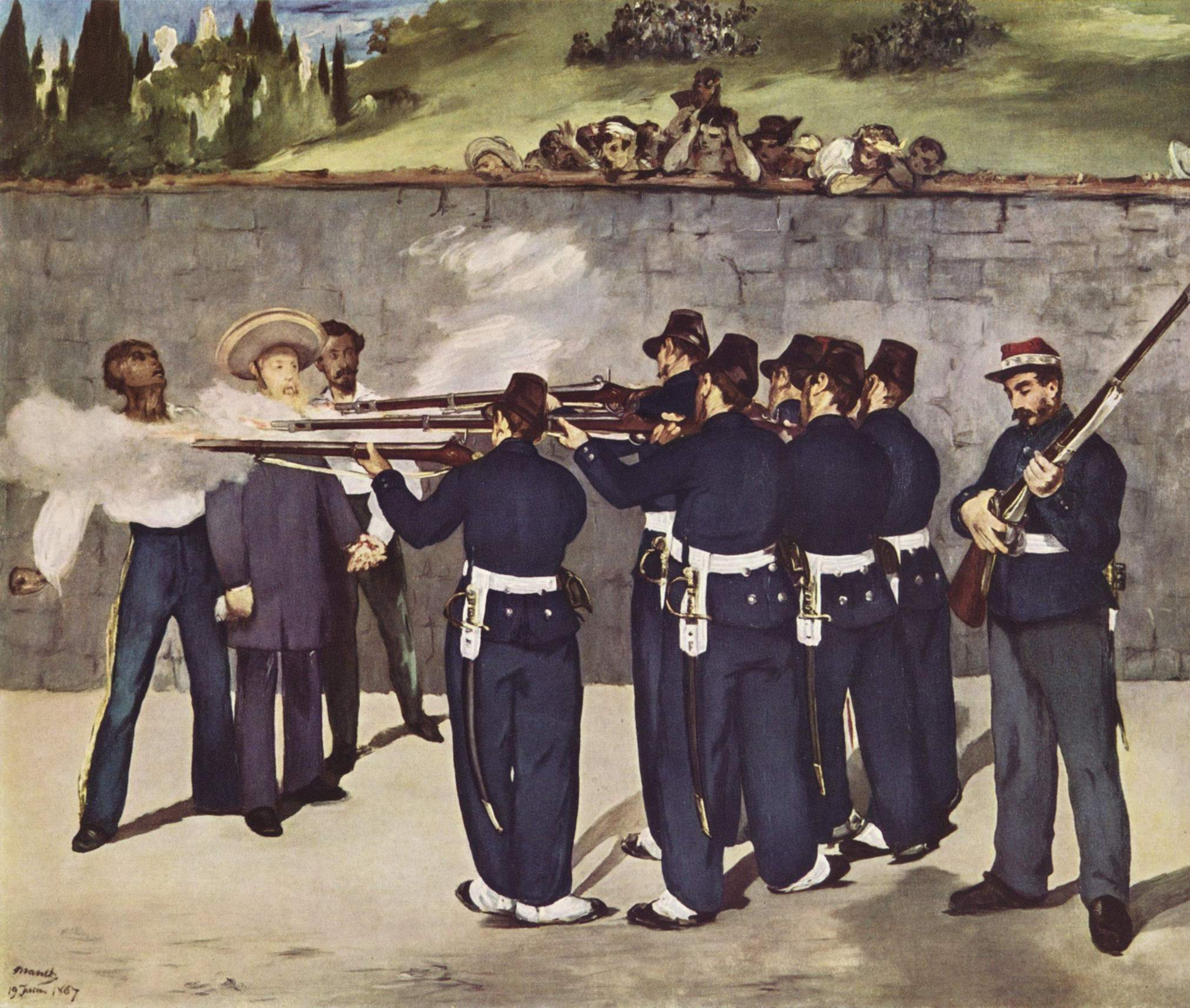
The Execution of Maximilian by Édouard Manet

Maximilian proposed a truce with Juárez and the summoning of a national congress to decide the fate of the Empire, but the proposal was ignored. The last of the French troops departed on 12 March 1867. Without French support, the rapidly collapsing Empire hardly lasted two months. Maximilian had returned to Mexico City and then headed northwest to Querétaro, where the Emperor and his top generals were captured after the end of a siege on 14 May 1867.

On 13 June, while President Juárez was now in San Luis Potosí, the government of the Mexican Republic placed Maximilian on trial in Querétaro for aiding the French invasion of Mexico, attempting to overthrow the Mexican government, and prolonging the bloodshed when his cause was already lost. His leading Mexican generals Tomas Mejia and Miguel Miramon were placed on trial alongside him for treason. All three were found guilty and sentenced to death. President Juárez rejected all appeals for clemency, including several official appeals from European governmentsand the three prisoners were eventually shot by firing squad on 19 June.

== Restored Republic ==
=== Return to Mexico City ===
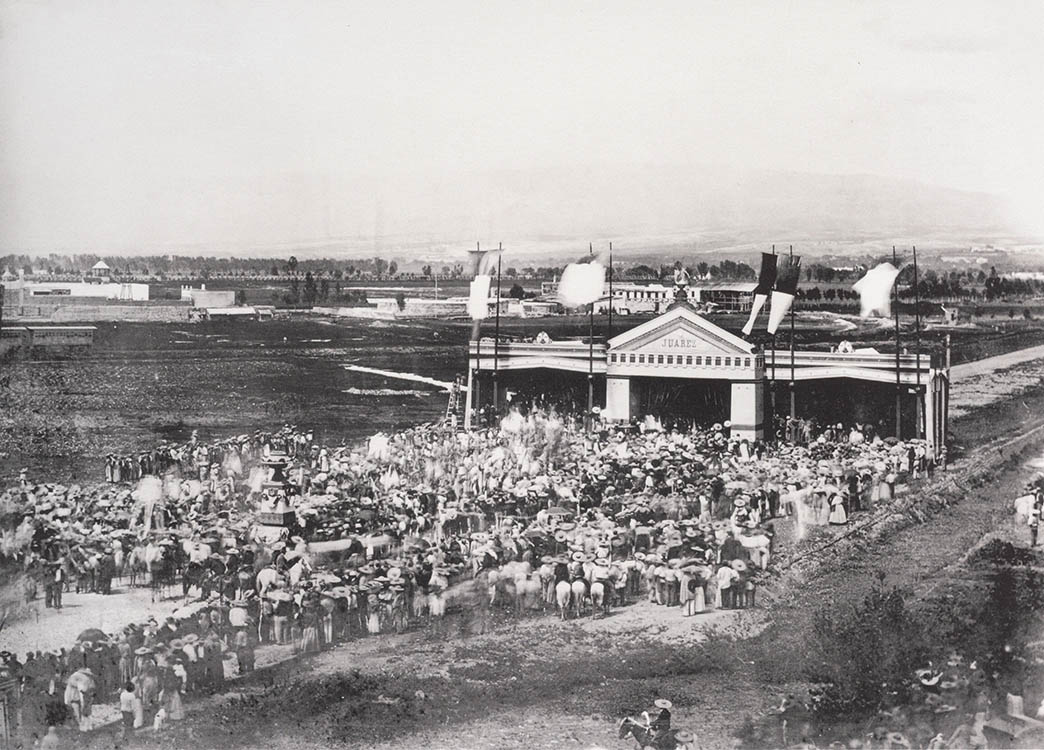
Triumphal arch set up for President Juárez's reentry into Mexico City

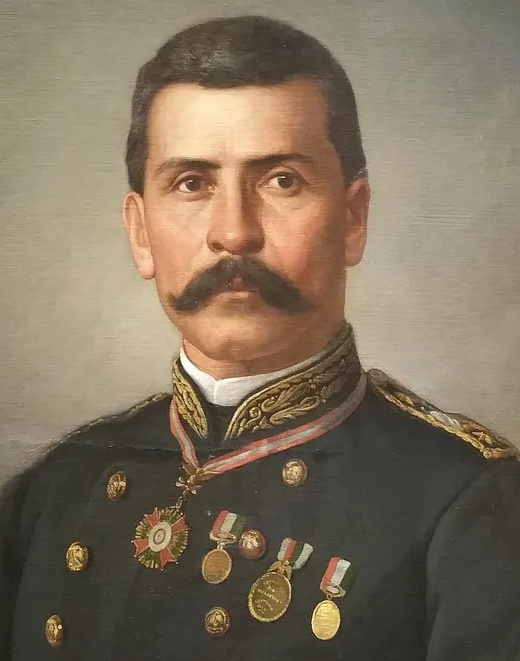
After unwavering loyalty during the intervention, General Porfirio Díaz attempted to become president through an ill-fated armed revolt against Juárez.

Juárez reentered the capital on the morning of 15 July, with Sebastián Lerdo de Tejada, José María Iglesias, and Ignacio Mejía, to public acclaim, the ringing of bells, and ceremonial artillery fire. He commuted the death sentences of several imperialists, but showed no mercy to the more important collaborators. Santiago Vidaurri was shot without even a trial. Juárez used his emergency presidential powers to abrogate a law of confiscation that was reducing collaborationist families to poverty, instead replacing their penalty with a fine.

Juárez reorganized his cabinet and reestablished the department of development. He decreed that the governments of the states should now return to their respective capitals. The army was also reduced in size. The Supreme Court was re-established under the presidency of Sebastian Lerdo de Tejada. Day to day judicial acts during the French occupation, such as the granting of marriage certificates, were decreed valid.

A long-awaited electoral act was passed on 14 August, decreeing elections for the presidency, congress, and the supreme court. Referendums to amend the constitution were proposed, but opponents against any such amendments began to coalesce around the rival presidential candidacy of Porfirio Díaz.

Juárez subsequently won the presidential election which was held in October. He formally relinquished his emergency powers and on 25 December, officially began a new term scheduled to end on 30 November 1871.

At the opening of Congress on that same December, Juárez gave thanks to the American people, for their consistent support of the Mexican Republic during the French Intervention. Juárez also had to deal with certain insurrections, including a new resurgence in the Caste War, which ended in the establishment of a military colony in Campeche, and the Yaqui uprising in Sonora known as the Revolución de los Ríos.

Juárez's determination to maintain the same ministers that had served him during the intervention also inspired opposition from those within the Liberal Party ambitious to share in those offices. A January 1868 request to congress asking for increased powers for the presidency inspired opposition from those who believed Juárez was becoming autocratic. Gonzalez Ortega, who had already challenged Juárez twice during the intervention continued to press his constitutional claims to the presidency. On 18 August 1868, Ortega's supporter General José María Patoni was assassinated by a local military brigade, leading to great public scandal.

The year 1869 was marked by minor scattered revolts, but a much more significant insurrection broke out in December, led by the Governor of Zacatecas. The affected states were placed under martial law, and the revolt was suppressed by February 1870.

On 13 October 1870, a general amnesty law was passed against those who had collaborated with the French, excepting certain high officials.

=== Díaz revolts ===
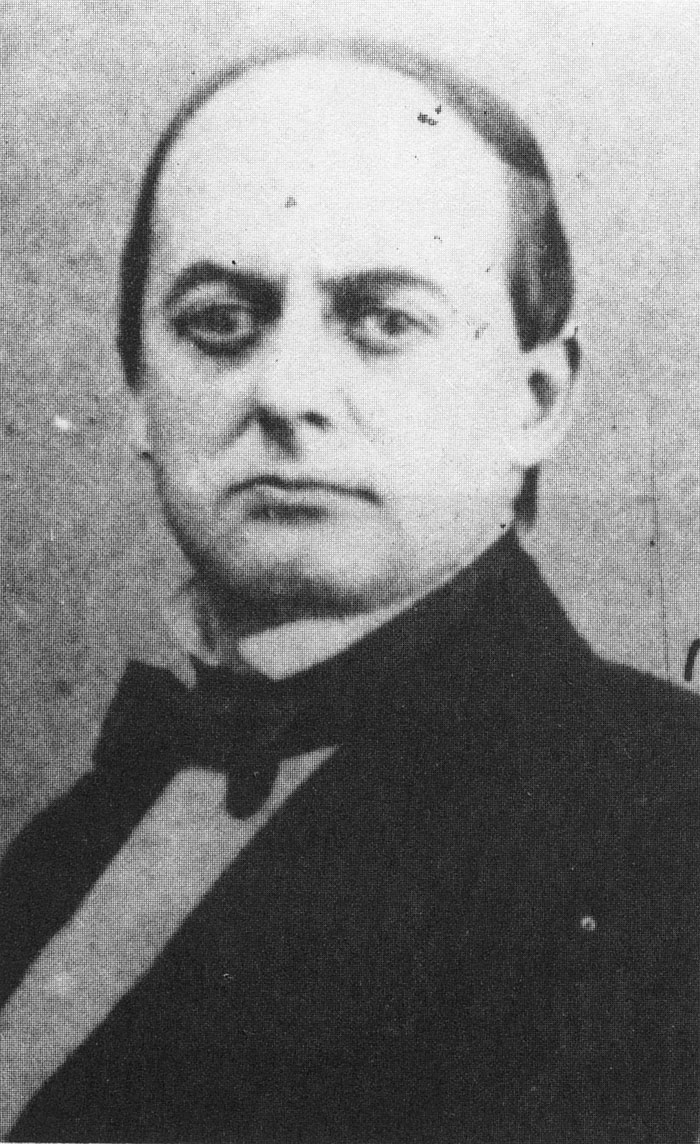
Upon the death of Juárez, he was succeeded as president by Sebastián Lerdo de Tejada.

As the 1871 presidential election approached, Juárez once more declared his candidacy, causing great opposition among those who viewed such a long term in power as a violation of the spirit of the constitution. Juárez had now been in power for more than twelve years. Porfirio Díaz once more ran for president, along with Sebastian Lerdo de Tejada. Juárez obtained a majority of the votes, but not to the degree constitutionally required to win the election, and so the selection of the president fell upon congress, which on 12 October 1871, decided in favor of Juárez.

Supporters of Díaz accused the government of engaging in election fraud, refused to recognize Juárez as the legitimate president, and prepared to take up arms. The subsequent insurrection would come to be known as the Plan de La Noria from the eponymous city in which the revolution was proclaimed from on 8 November 1871.

Supporting revolts flared up throughout the country, and even the government of the State of Sonora officially joined the revolt in December 1871. As late as July 1872 the military situation was serious because, though the Juárez government had won a series of victories, they had not been decisive. Juárez called Díaz a "latter-day Santa Anna", invoking the liberals' archenemy. Juárez took the opportunity of the rebellion to attack entrenched groups within various states, using government forces to neutralize rebellious elements in state militias.

== Personal life ==
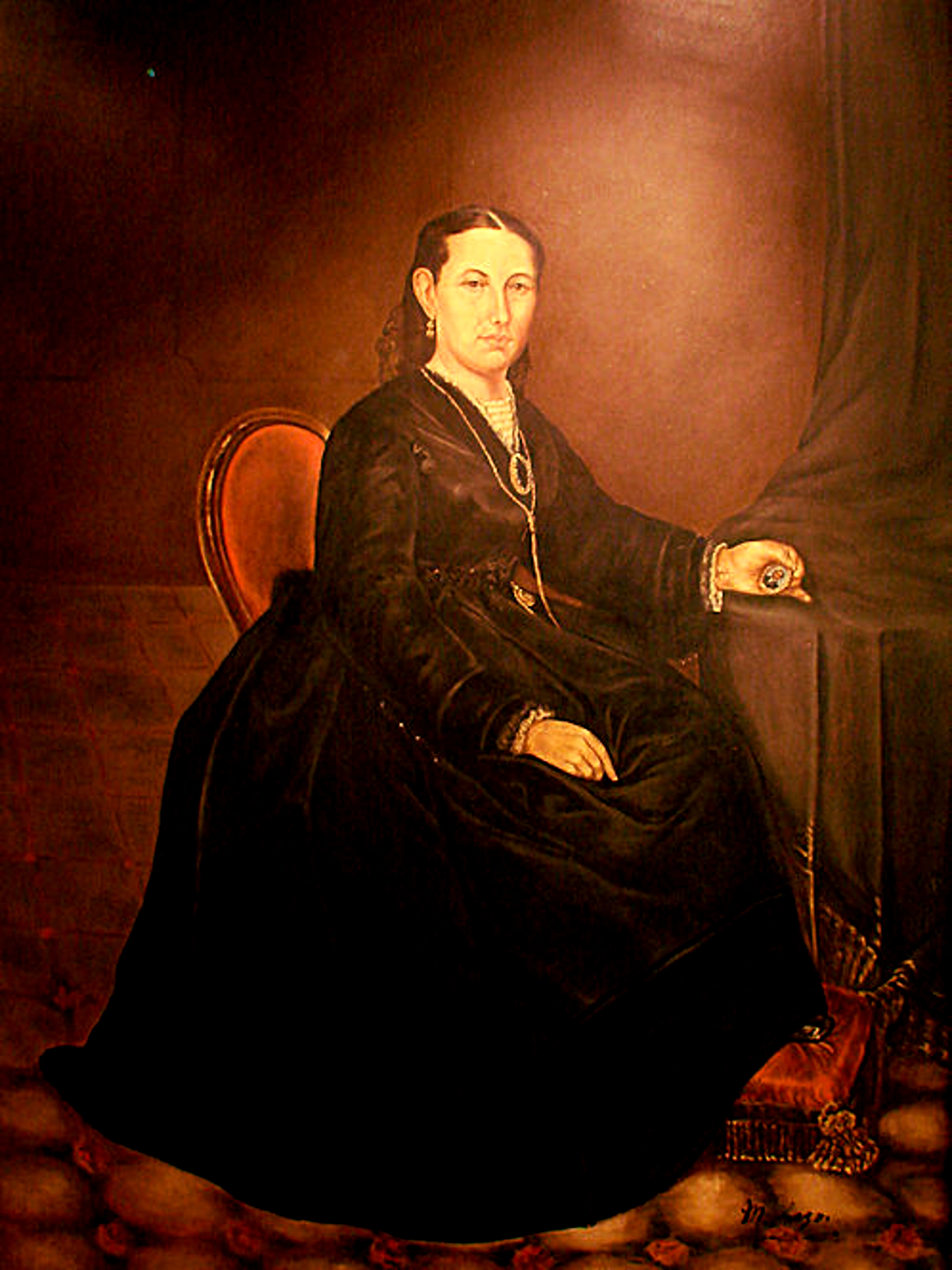
Margarita Maza de Juárez

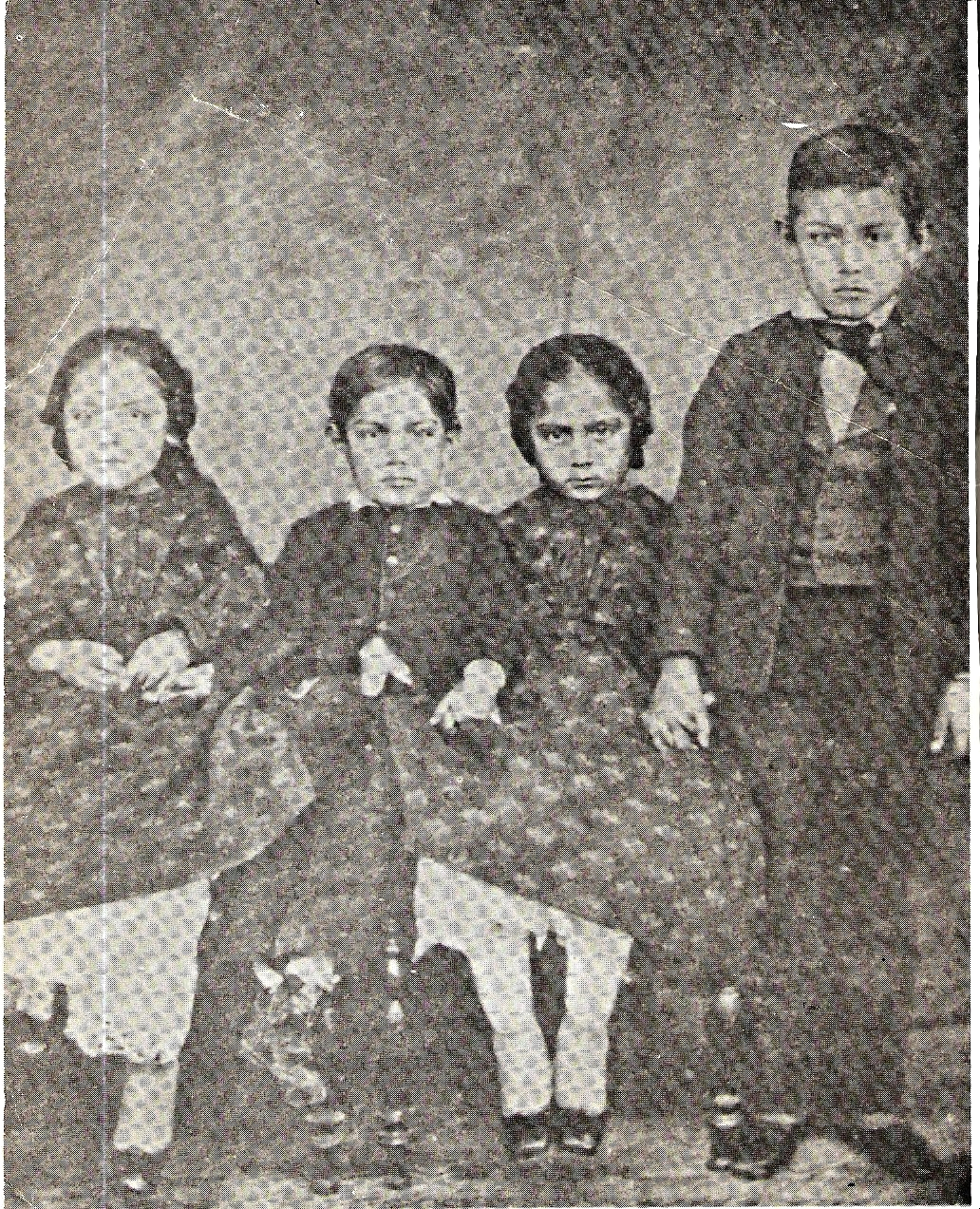
Children of Benito Juárez

On 31 October 1843, when he was in his late 30s, Juárez married Margarita Maza, the adoptive daughter of his sister's patron. Margarita was 20 years younger than Juárez. Her father Antonio Maza Padilla was from Genoa and her mother Petra Parada Sigüenza was Mexican and of Spanish descent. They were part of Oaxaca's upper-class society. Margarita Maza accepted his proposal and said of Juárez, "He is very homely, but very good." With his marriage to a white woman, Juárez gained social standing. Although legal racial categories were abolished shortly after independence, in social life, ethnic categories were still used. Their ethnically mixed (white/Indigenous) marriage was unusual at the time, but it is not often explicitly noted in standard biographies. Their marriage lasted until Margarita's death from cancer in January 1871, when Juárez was planning his run for reelection. Juárez and Maza had ten children together, who were ethnically mixed mestizos, including twins María de Jesús and Josefa, born in 1854. Two boys and three girls died in early childhood. Two of their sons died while they were in exile in New York with their mother during the French Intervention. Their only surviving son was Benito Juárez Maza, b. 29 October 1852, was a diplomat and politician, and Governor of Oaxaca 1911–12; he married but had no children. Juárez's daughter Manuela married Cuban poet and separatist Pedro Santacilia in May 1863.

Benito Juárez also had an extramarital relationship with Andra Campa, with whom he had a daughter Beatriz Juárez. Benito Juárez officially recognized Beatriz as his own child by giving her his last name in her birth certificate. Beatriz Juárez later married Alberto Savage Robert and together, they had three children named Alberto Savage Juárez, Beatriz Savage Juárez and Carlos Savage Juárez, who became a cadet in Mexico's Heroic Military Academy and participated in the famous "Marcha de la Lealtad" or "March of Loyalty" of Mexican ex-president Francisco I. Madero. Carlos Savage Juárez's children were well known in the film industry: Carlos Savage (1919–2000) was a highly respected Mexican film editor who contributed to over 1,000 award-winning films and documentaries throughout his career.

Benito Juárez is also known to have had two other children with other women. He had fathered a son and a daughter before he married Margarita, a son, Tereso, perhaps around 1838; and Susana. Little is known about them. One of his biographers, Charles Allen Smart, citing the work of Jorge L. Tamayo, the editor of Juárez's letters, says that Juárez's natural son might be alluded to in a letter from a certain Refugio Álvarez, an officer during the French invasion. Juárez's son was taken prisoner by conservative general Tomás Mejía when the conservatives captured San Luis Potosí in December 1863. Juárez's two sons with Margarita Maza were minors at the time and the third not yet born, so the conclusion is that the letter refers to Tereso. In his research for the biography, Smart found no explicit references to Tereso. Juárez's daughter Susana was mentioned by Tamayo, and Smart includes that information, but without page citations to Tamayo's publication. Susana was said to have become an invalid and a narcotics addict who was cared for by Juárez's friends Sr. Miguel Castro and his wife when Castro was governor of Oaxaca. The natural children's mother died before Juárez married Margarita, when Susana was three years old. Juárez and his wife formally adopted Susana, who never married and was with her adoptive mother at her death. Margarita Maza de Juárez was buried in the Juárez mausoleum in Mexico City.

Juárez wrote books for his children, such as the book "Apuntes para mis Hijos" ("Notes for my Children" in English). However, this book only briefly talked about his Indigenous heritage, describing his parents as "Indians of the country's primitive race." His vision of Mexico was that individual Indigenous Mexicans would assimilate culturally and become full citizens of Mexico, equal before the law. "Everything that Juárez and the Liberal circle stood for militated against [his] identification" as an Indigenous person. According to one biographer, he "has been the object of so much mythology that it is almost impossible to uncover the facts of his life."

Juárez was a 33rd Scottish Rite Freemason and a member of the directive of the Mexican brotherhood. He was initiated under the name of Guillermo Tell.

Juárez's health suffered in 1870, but he recovered. His wife Margarita died in 1871 and his health began to fail in 1872. He suffered a heart attack in March 1872, the day before his birthday. He suffered another attack on 8 July and a fatal attack on 17 July.

=== Freemasonry ===
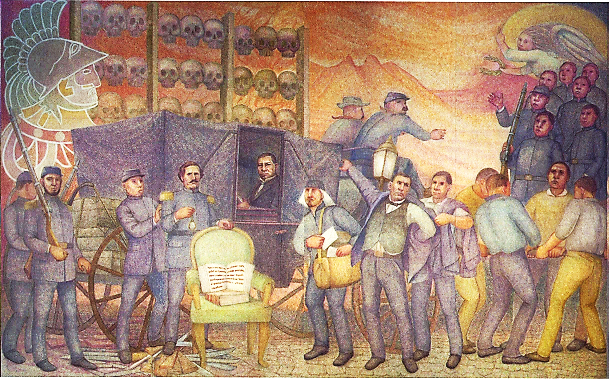
Fragment of the mural "The Pilgrim Republic" by Antonio González Orozco (Chihuahua, México, 2016)

Juárez was initiated into Freemasonry in the York Rite in Oaxaca. He then moved to the National Mexican Rite, where he ascended to the highest degree, the ninth, which is equivalent to the 33rd degree of the Ancient and Accepted Scottish Rite. The York Rite was of more liberal and republican ideas with respect to the Scottish Rite that also existed in Mexico, which was of centralist political ideas. The National Mexican Rite emerged from a group of Yorkist Masons and another group of Scottish Masons whose common objective was to gain independence from foreigners and promote a nationalist mentality.

Juárez was fervent in Masonic practice. His name is held in veneration in many rites. Many lodges and philosophical bodies have adopted him as a sacred symbol.

Juárez's initiation ceremony was attended by distinguished Masons, such as Manuel Crescencio Rejon, author of the Yucatán Constitution of 1840; Valentín Gómez Farías, President of Mexico; Pedro Zubieta, General Commander in the Federal District and the State of Mexico; Congressman Fernando Ortega; Congressman Tiburcio Cañas; Congressman Francisco Banuet; Congressman Agustin Buenrostro; Congressman Joaquin Navarro and Congressman Miguel Lerdo de Tejada. After the proclamation, the apprentice mason Juárez adopted the symbolic name of Guillermo Tell, 14th century Swiss folk hero.

== Death ==
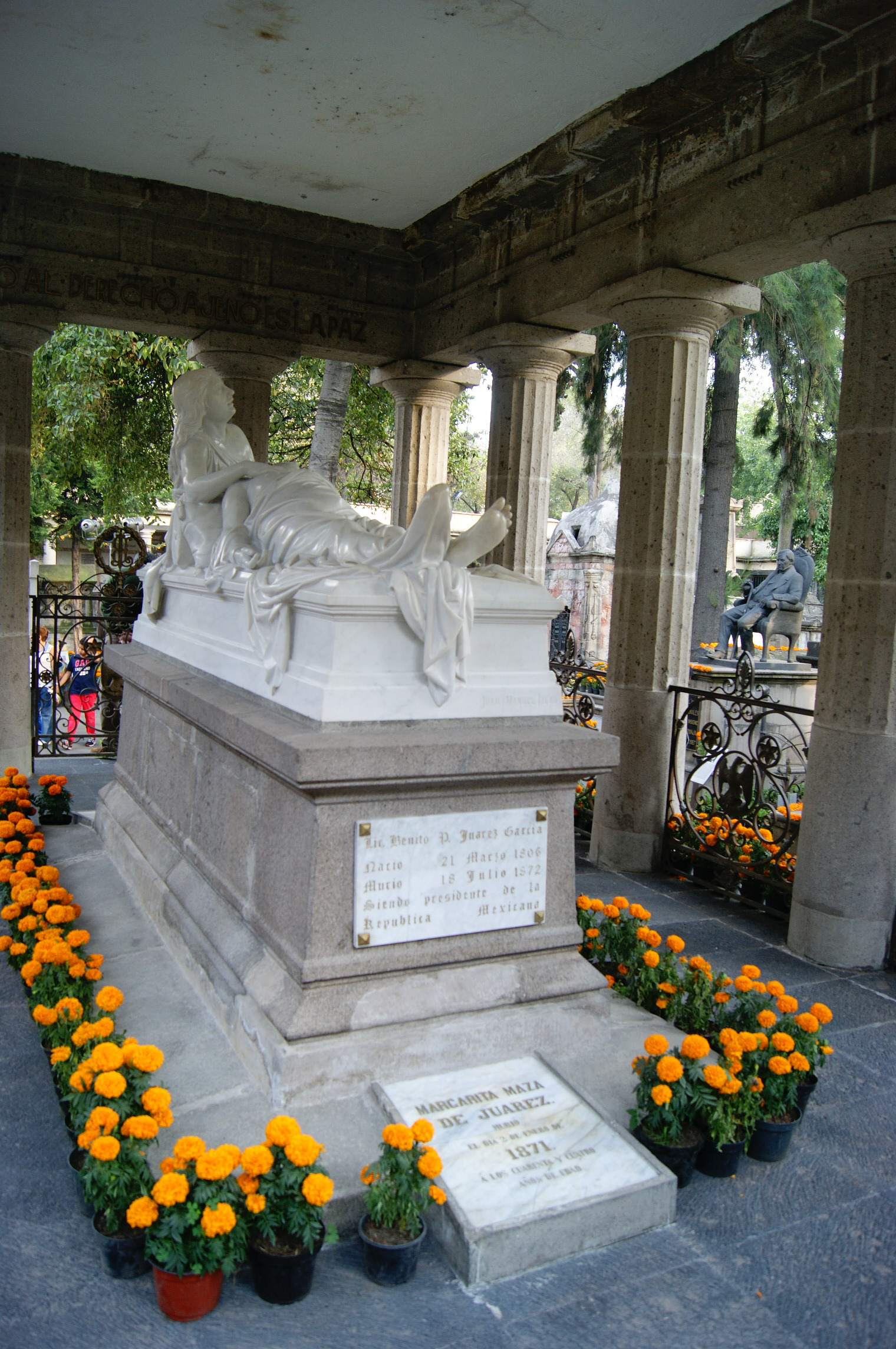
Tomb of Benito Juárez. The remains of his wife Margarita Maza are buried in the same mausoleum.

Juárez died of a heart attack on 18 July 1872, aged 66. He had been ill for two days, seemingly without alarming symptoms, but he appears to have suffered an attack similar to the one in October 1870. "At daybreak on the morning of the 19th [of July] the inhabitants of this capital were startled by the roar of artillery, followed by a gun [shot] each quarter of an hour, which indicated the death of the head of the government." A death mask was made and Juárez was given a state funeral. He is buried in the Panteón de San Fernando, where other Mexican notables are interred. There is an account in Ralph Roeder's 1947 lengthy biography of Juárez about his death, but although the work has many direct quotations from sources, it is flawed because there are no scholarly citations.

When Juárez died, Díaz's reasons for rebellion – fraudulent elections, presidential coercion of states – no longer existed. He was succeeded by Sebastián Lerdo de Tejada, the head of the Supreme Court. Díaz was amnestied for his rebellion by Lerdo in November 1872. Díaz later rebelled against Lerdo in 1876. Although Díaz was a rival of Juárez during his life, after Díaz seized power he helped shape the historical memory of Juárez.

== Legacy ==
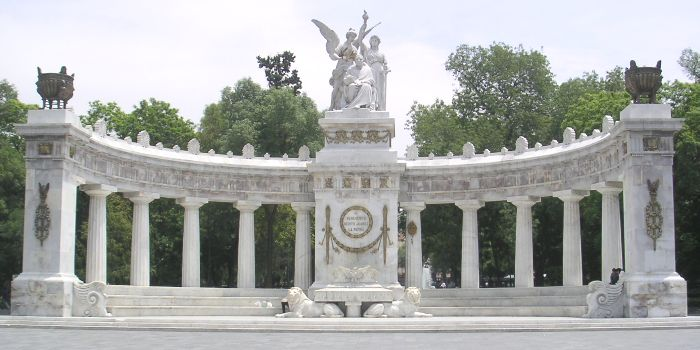
Monument to Juárez in central Mexico City, built by his old political rival Porfirio Díaz to commemorate the centenary of Juárez's 1806 birth.

Juárez came to be seen as "a preeminent symbol of Mexican nationalism and resistance to foreign intervention". His policies advocated civil liberties, equality before the law, the sovereignty of civilian power over the Catholic Church and the military, the strengthening of the Mexican federal government, and the depersonalization of political life. For Juárez's success in ousting French invasion, Mexicans considered Juárez's tenure as a time of a "second struggle for independence, a second defeat for the European powers, and a second reversal of the Conquest".

Today, Benito Juárez is remembered as being a progressive reformer dedicated to democracy, equal rights for Indigenous peoples, reduction in the power of organized religion, especially the Catholic Church, and a defense of national sovereignty. The period of his leadership is known in Mexican history as La Reforma del Norte ("reform of the north"). It constituted a liberal political and social revolution with major institutional consequences: the expropriation of church lands, the subordination of the army to civilian control, liquidation of peasant communal landholdings, the separation of church and state in public affairs, and the disenfranchisement of bishops, priests, nuns, and lay brothers, codified in the "Juárez Law", or "Ley Juárez".

La Reforma represented the triumph of Mexico's liberal, federalist, anti-clerical, and pro-capitalist forces over the conservative, centrist, corporatist, and theocratic elements that sought to reconstitute a locally run version of the colonial era. It replaced a semi-feudal social system with a more market-driven one. But, following Juárez's death, the lack of adequate democratic and institutional stability soon resulted in a return to centralized autocracy and economic exploitation under the regime of Porfirio Díaz. The Porfiriato (1876–1911), in turn, collapsed at the beginning of the Mexican Revolution.

== Honors and recognition ==
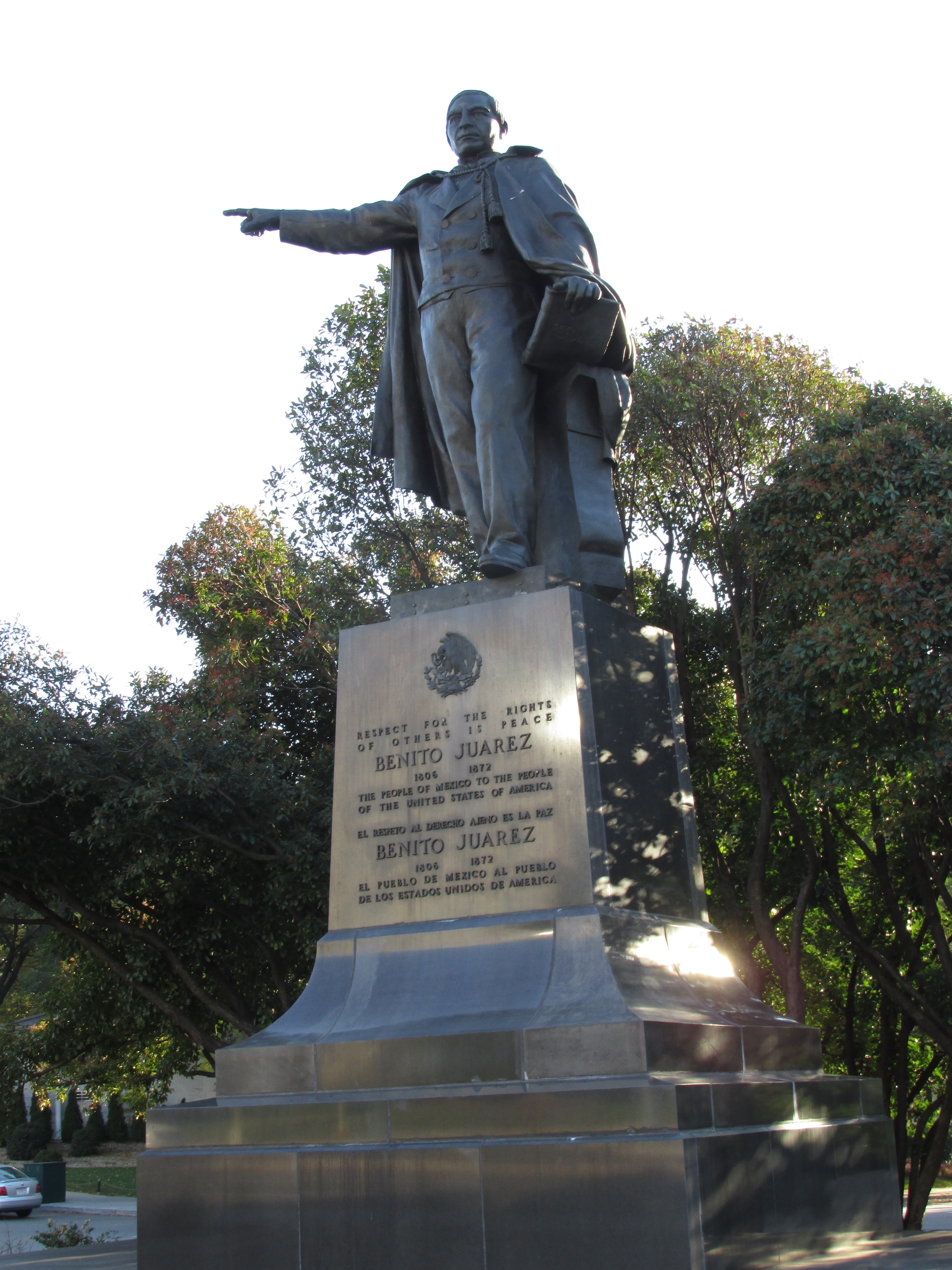
The Benito Juárez statue in Washington, D.C., a gift of the Mexican people to the people of the U.S., 1968

Honors in his lifetime

- On 7 February 1866, Juárez was elected as a companion of the 3rd class of the Pennsylvania Commandery of the Military Order of the Loyal Legion of the United States (MOLLUS). While membership in MOLLUS was normally limited to Union officers who had served during the American Civil War and their descendants, members of the 3rd Class were civilians who had made a significant contribution to the Union war effort. Juárez is one of the very few non-United States citizens to be a MOLLUS companion.
- On 11 May 1867, the Congress of the Dominican Republic proclaimed Juárez the Benemérito de la América (Distinguished of America).
- On 16 July 1867, the government of Peru recognized Juárez's accomplishments and on 28 July of the same year the School of Medicine of San Fernando, Perú, issued a gold medal to honor him; the medal can be seen at the Museo Nacional de Historia.

Place names

- Numerous cities, towns, streets, and institutions in Mexico are named after Benito Juárez, including the former El Paso del Norte, now called Ciudad Juárez; see Juárez (disambiguation) for a partial list.
- Mexico City International Airport is better known in Mexico by its first official name Aeropuerto Internacional Benito Juárez, or internationally often as Mexico City Juárez.
- The Benito Juárez Partido in Buenos Aires Province, Argentina, and the city of Benito Juárez, Buenos Aires are both named after Juárez, as a gesture of friendship between Argentina and Mexico.
- Benito Juárez Marg (marg means road in Sanskrit/Hindi) is a major road in South Delhi, India.

Mexican currency

- Juárez is depicted on the 20-peso banknote. From the time of Juárez, Mexico's government has issued several notes with the face and the subject of Juárez. In 2000, $20.00 (twenty pesos) bills were issued: on one side is the bust of Juárez and to his left, the Juarista eagle across the Chamber. In 2018, new $500.00 (five hundred pesos) bills were released, also featuring the bust of Juárez. A caption directly below this says in Spanish, "President Benito Juárez, promoter of the Laws of Reform, during his triumphant entrance to Mexico City on 13 July 1867, symbolizing the restoration of the Republic". Juárez appears to face a depiction of his entrance into Mexico City. His likeness appears on two bills simultaneously, and while both are blue in color, the 500-peso and 20-peso notes differ in size and texture.

Monuments and statuary

Benito Juárez is notable for the number of statues and monuments in his honor outside of Mexico.

- In Washington, D.C., is a monument of Juárez by Enrique Alciati, a gift to the US from Mexico. It sits in the intersection of New Hampshire and Virginia Avenues.
- The sculptor Julian Martinez dedicated two works to Juárez, a full sculpture in Chicago and a bust in Houston.
- In New York City is Benito Juárez (2004), a sculpture by Mexican Moises Cabrera Orozco, installed in Bryant Park in Manhattan.
- Statue of Benito Juárez (San Diego)
- Statue of Benito Juárez in New Orleans
- Statue of Benito Juárez in Havana, Cuba

Media portrayals

- Franz Werfel wrote the play Juárez and Maximilian which was presented at Berlin in 1924, directed by Max Reinhardt.
- Juárez is a 1939 American historical drama film directed by William Dieterle, and starring Paul Muni as Juárez.
- Carleton Young portrayed Juárez in Zorro's Fighting Legion (1939)
- The actor Jan Arvan (1913–1979) was cast as President Juárez in the 1959 episode, "A Town Is Born" on the syndicated television anthology series, Death Valley Days, hosted by Stanley Andrews. Than Wyenn played Isaacs, a storekeeper in Nogales, Arizona Territory, who hides gold for the Mexican government in the fight against Maximilian. Jean Howell played his wife, Ruth Isaacs.
- Frank Sorello (1929–2013) portrayed Juárez in two episodes of Robert Conrad's The Wild Wild West, an American espionage adventure television program: "The Night of the Eccentrics" (1966), and "The Night of the Assassin" (1967).
- Juárez is a character in Harry Harrison's alternate history novels the Stars and Stripes trilogy
- The conflict between the Juaristas and Maximillian's troops is a major plot point of the 1969 film The Undefeated, starring John Wayne and Rock Hudson.
- Yuri Herrera wrote the fictional account Season of the Swamp (2024) about the one-and-a-half years Juàrez was in New Orleans.
- Civilization VII features him as one of Mexico's Revolucionario Units during the modern era

Other eponyms

- The Italian dictator Benito Mussolini was named after Juárez.
- In Sofia, Bulgaria, the municipal school Primary school Nr. 49 is named after Juárez.
- In Warsaw, Poland, the public school Szkoła Podstawowa Nr. 85 im. Benito Juáreza w Warszawie is named after Juárez.
- Juárez is commemorated in the scientific name of a species of Mexican snake, Geophis juarezi.

Juárez Complex National Palace

In the National Palace in Mexico City, where he lived while in power, there is a small museum in his honor. It contains his furniture and personal effects.

Living room, dining room, study and bedroom of don Benito Juárez

== Quotes ==
Juárez's quote continues to be well-remembered in Mexico: Entre los individuos, como entre las naciones, el respeto al derecho ajeno es la paz, meaning "Among individuals, as among nations, respect for the rights of others is peace". The portion of this motto in bold is inscribed on the coat of arms of Oaxaca. A portion is inscribed on the Juárez statue in Bryant Park in New York City, "Respect for the rights of others is peace." This quote summarizes Mexico's stances toward foreign affairs.

Another notable quote: La ley ha sido siempre mi espada y mi escudo, or "The law has always been my shield and my sword", is a phrase often displayed inside court and tribunals buildings.

== See also ==
- History of the Catholic Church in Mexico
- List of heads of state of Mexico
- Statues of the Liberators

== Bibliography ==
- Bancroft, Hubert Howe (1885). History of Mexico. Vol. 5.
- Bancroft, Hubert Howe (1888). History of Mexico. Vol. 6.
- Burke, Ulick Ralph (1894). A Life of Benito Juárez Constitutional President of Mexico.
- Cadenhead, Ivie E. Jr. Benito Juárez. 1973.
- Galeana, Patricia (2022). Benito Juárez: El hombre y el símbolo [Benito Juárez: The man and the symbol] (in Spanish). Crítica. ISBN 978-607-569-326-2.
- González Lezama, Raúl (2012). Martínez Ocampo, Lourdes (ed.). Reforma Liberal, Cronología (1854-1876) [Liberal Reform, Chronology (1854–1876)] (PDF) (in Spanish). Instituto Nacional de Estudios Históricos de las Revoluciones de México. ISBN 978-607-7916-70-3.
- Hannay, David (1917). Diaz.
- Hamnett, Brian. "Benito Juárez", in Encyclopedia of Mexico, vol. 1. Chicago: Fitzroy Dearborn 1997
- Hamnett, Brian. Juárez (Profiles in Power). New York: Longmans, 1994. ISBN 978-0582050532.
- Krauze, Enrique, Mexico: Biography of Power. New York: HarperCollins 1997. ISBN 0-06-016325-9
- Rivera Cambas, Manuel (1873). Los Gobernantes de Mexico [The Rulers of Mexico] (in Spanish). Vol. 2.
- Roeder, Ralph. Juárez and His Mexico: A Biographical History. 2 vols. 1947.
- Scholes, Walter V. Mexican Politics During the Juárez Regime, 1855–1872. Columbia MO: University of Missouri Press 1957.
- Sinkin, Richard N. The Mexican Reform, 1855–1876: A Study in Liberal Nation-Building. 1979.
- Smart, Charles Allen. Viva Juárez: A Biography. 1963.
- Stevens, D. F. "Benito Juárez". Encyclopedia of Latin American History and Culture, vol. 3. New York: Charles Scribner's Sons 1996.
- Weeks, Charles A. The Juárez Myth in Mexico. Tuscaloosa: University of Alabama Press 1987.

Political offices
Preceded by Ignacio Comonfort	President of Mexico; 15 January 1858 – 10 April 1864	Succeeded by Juan Nepomuceno Almonte; José Mariano Salas as Regents
Preceded by Himself	President of Mexico (in exile); 10 April 1864 – 15 May 1867	Succeeded by Himself
Preceded by Maximilian I of Mexico as Emperor	President of Mexico; 15 May 1867 – 18 July 1872	Succeeded by Sebastián Lerdo de Tejada
