= Margarita Maza =

First Lady of Mexico (1826–1871)

Margarita Maza de Juárez
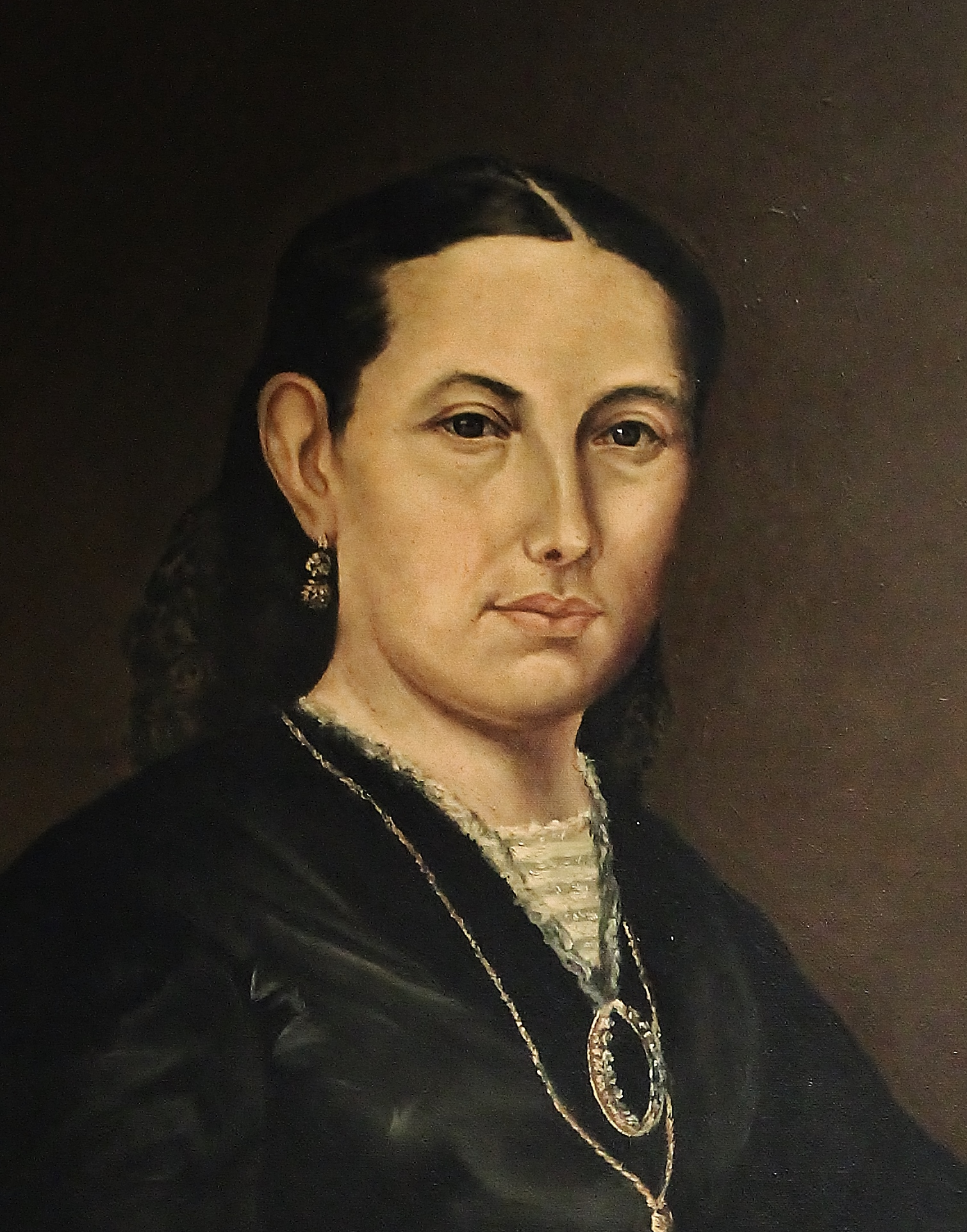
- Margarita Maza de Juárez (19th century)

First Lady of Mexico
- In office January 21, 1858 - January 2, 1871

Personal details
- Born: Margarita Eustaquia Maza Parada; March 29, 1826 Oaxaca de Juárez, Oaxaca, Mexico
- Died: January 2, 1871 (aged 44) Mexico City, Mexico
- Resting place: Panteón de San Fernando, Mexico City
- Party: Liberal Party
- Spouse: Benito Juárez (m. 1843)
- Children: 12

Margarita Eustaquia Maza Parada (March 29, 1826 – January 2, 1871), later known as Margarita Maza de Juárez, was the wife of Benito Juárez and First Lady of Mexico from 1858 to 1871.

Maza was of White European (Criollo) origin, and she was born to a wealthy family. Maza's marriage to her husband Juárez helped him rise to power, as it elevated him to the Mexican upper class. After she became First Lady, Maza helped support the Liberal movement.

The government of Mexico dedicated the year 2026 to Margarita Maza to recognize her legacy.

== Biography ==
Margarita Eustaquia Maza Parada was born to a wealthy European (Criollo) family in Oaxaca de Juárez, Oaxaca, Mexico, in 1826. Her parents were Antonio Maza and Petra Parada Sigüenza. Her father was an agricultural businessman who was known in the city as "El Gachupín" (The Spaniard). Margarita Maza received a refined education due to her upper class background.

As was common in those years, her family had hired young Zapotecs to work in the household as domestic servants. They tended to come from small, rural villages. Years before Margarita's birth, Josefa Juárez García – Benito Juárez's sister – had worked for some time as a maid and cook in the Maza-Parada household. She and her siblings were orphaned after the deaths of their parents and grandparents. Benito Juárez, one of her younger brothers, left their home town of San Pablo Guelatao in 1818 and came to the city of Oaxaca at the age of 12, to work and get an education. Josefa helped him get a position with the Maza family, and he developed a close relationship with them. Today the former Maza family house is known as Casa de Juarez and operated as a museum in his honor.

Aided by a Franciscan named Antonio Salanueva who recognized his intelligence and desire for learning, Juárez entered a seminary. Not feeling called to the priesthood, he decided to study law in college, where he also began to be politically active. He was elected to the city council of Oaxaca. He got his law degree, practiced several years as a lawyer to get established, and in 1841 was appointed as a judge. He had entered the educated professional class in the city.

=== Marriage and family ===
During these years, Margarita Maza was being educated and approaching womanhood. She accepted Juárez's proposal and was married to him on October 31, 1843 in the church of San Felipe Neri in Oaxaca City. Juárez was 37, and Margarita was 17. Their interracial marriage was controversial and brought scrutiny from the city's Criollo community. They had 12 children together, seven of whom lived to adulthood: one boy and six girls. (Note: Another source says they had eleven children, three boys and eight girls, of whom two boys and a girl died young.)

In addition, they adopted Susana Chagoya, Juárez's daughter from a relationship before his marriage. Her mother died when the girl was three. Margarita knew that Juárez also had an older son, Tereso, from that relationship, whom she got to know later.

Their ethnically mixed marriage was unusual at the time, but this is not often noted in standard biographies. Historian Enrique Krauze notes: "In this uncommon instance, a white woman had been conquered by an Indian, not a native woman by a Spaniard."

== Family life and First Lady ==
Margarita Maza de Juárez built their family life as her husband advanced in politics. She managed a full household, including servants to assist her increasingly large family. As an educated woman, she is believed to have supported her husband in his work and to have taken an active role in discussing politics. Such actions were not well recognized for decades.

He was appointed to the chief justice position on the Supreme Court, putting him in the line of succession in 1858 after the Conservatives forced out the president. Juárez succeeded to the presidency in 1858 from his position as chief judge on the Supreme Court, according to the Constitution. The Conservatives had forced out the previous president, and for a time two governments ran in competition. He represented the Liberal Party. He was later elected to the office in his own right.

During the French Invasion of Mexico that began in 1862, Juárez was leading the resistance against the French and the Mexican Empire they installed under Emperor Maximilian I. Margarita Maza de Juárez at first stayed with her husband in Northern Mexico, but then had to leave the country to protect their children. She lived with her family for a time in New York City, and then in Washington, D.C., where they lived in exile for a few years. Two of their young sons died, in 1864 and 1865.

Maza de Juárez took on a diplomatic role, meeting with top-ranking Americans, including U.S. President Abraham Lincoln, who received her as the First Lady of Mexico. The US recognized Benito Juárez as representing the only legitimate government of Mexico.

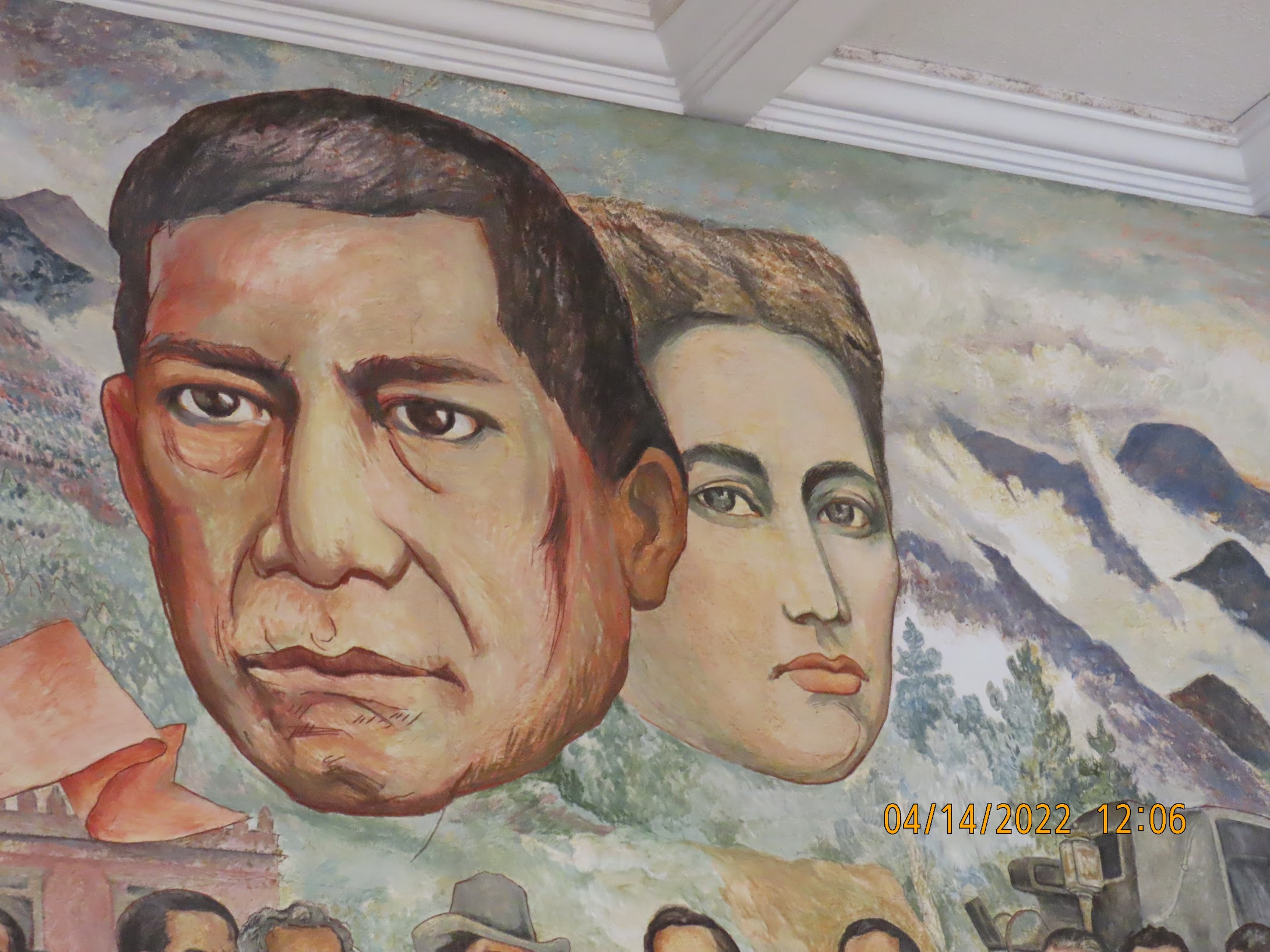
Benito Juárez and Margarita Maza depicted on a mural by Arturo García Bustos.

In addition to that diplomatic role, Maza de Juárez and her daughters worked with other Liberal Mexican women to organize in support of the war effort against the French. They raised funds for the troops, to supply hospitals, and to care for civilian victims of the war.

After Maximilian I was executed in 1867, the war ended and Margarita Maza de Juárez returned to Mexico with her family. Her husband resumed the presidency, and was re-elected to office in his own right, serving until his death in 1872. He survived his wife's death from cancer by a year. The couple were buried together in the Juárez mausoleum in Mexico City.

Their only surviving son, Benito Luis Narciso Juárez Maza (b. 29 October 1852), pursued careers in diplomacy and politics and briefly served as governor of Oaxaca (1911–12). Contemporary sources generally describe his administrative performance as unremarkable. He married María Klerian, a French woman; the couple had no surviving children.

Descendants of the Juárez-Maza marriage were born through their daughters' families, thus the paternal surname was lost.
