= Anti-clericalism in Latin America =

Anti-clericalism in Latin America sprang up in opposition to the power and influence of the Catholic Church in colonial and post-colonial Latin America.

== Mexico ==
The Mexican Constitution of 1824 had required the Republic to prohibit the exercise of any religion other the Roman Catholic and Apostolic faith.

=== Reform War ===
The War of Reform (Spanish: Guerra de Reforma) in Mexico, during the Second Federal Republic of Mexico, was the three-year civil war (1857–1860) between members of the Liberal Party who had taken power in 1855 under the Plan of Ayutla, and members of the Conservative Party resisting the legitimacy of the government and its radical restructuring of Mexican laws, known as La Reforma. The Liberals wanted to eliminate the political, economic, and cultural power of the Catholic church as well as reduce the role of the Mexican Army. Both the Catholic Church and the Army were protected by corporate or institutional privileges (fueros) established in the colonial era. Liberals sought to create a modern nation-state founded on liberal principles. The Conservatives wanted a centralist government, some even a monarchy, with the Church and military keeping their traditional roles and powers, and with landed and merchant elites maintaining their dominance over the majority mixed-race and indigenous populations of Mexico.

This struggle erupted into a full-scale civil war when the Liberals, then in control of the government after ousting Antonio López de Santa Anna, began to implement a series of laws designed to strip the Church and military—but especially the Church—of its privileges and property. The liberals passed a series of separate laws implementing their vision of Mexico, and then promulgated the Constitution of 1857, which gave constitutional force to their program. Conservative resistance to this culminated in the Plan of Tacubaya, which ousted the government of President Ignacio Comonfort in a coup d'état and took control of Mexico City, forcing the Liberals to move their government to the city of Veracruz. The Conservatives controlled the capital and much of central Mexico, while the rest of the states had to choose whether to side with the Conservative government of Félix Zuloaga or Liberal government of Benito Juárez.

The Liberals lacked military experience and lost most of the early battles, but the tide turned when Conservatives twice failed to take the liberal stronghold of Veracruz. The government of U.S. President James Buchanan recognized the Juárez regime in April 1859 and the U.S. and the government of Juárez negotiated the McLane-Ocampo Treaty, which if ratified would have given the Liberal regime cash but also granted the U.S. transit rights through Mexican territory. Liberal victories accumulated thereafter until Conservative forces surrendered in December 1860. While the Conservative forces lost the war, guerrillas remained active in the countryside for years after, and Conservatives in Mexico would conspire with French forces to install Maximilian I as emperor during the following French Intervention in Mexico.

=== Cristero War ===
More severe laws called Calles Law during the rule of atheist Plutarco Elías Calles eventually led to the Cristero War, a widespread struggle in central and western Mexico. The massive popular rural uprising in north-central Mexico was tacitly supported by the Church hierarchy, and it was also aided by urban Catholic supporters. US Ambassador Dwight W. Morrow brokered negotiations between the Calles government and the Church. The government made some concessions, the Church withdrew its support for the Cristero fighters, and the conflict ended in 1929. The rebellion has been variously interpreted as a major event in the struggle between church and state that dates back to the 19th century with the War of Reform, as the last major peasant uprising in Mexico after the end of the military phase of the Mexican Revolution in 1920, and as a counter-revolutionary uprising by prosperous peasants and urban elites against the revolution's agrarian reforms.

== Colombia ==
Although Colombia enacted anticlerical legislation and its enforcement during more than three decades (1849–84), it soon restored “full liberty and independence from the civil power” to the Catholic Church.

La Violencia is considered to have begun with the 9 April 1948 assassination of the popular politician Jorge Eliécer Gaitán, a Liberal Party presidential candidate for the election in November 1949. His murder provoked the Bogotazo rioting that lasted for ten hours and killed some 5,000 people. An alternative historiography proposes as the start the Conservatives' return to power following the election of 1946. Rural town police and political leaders encouraged Conservative-supporting peasants to seize the agricultural lands of Liberal-supporting peasants, which provoked peasant-to-peasant violence throughout Colombia.

== See also ==
- Anti-clericalism
