= Encyclopedia of Mexico =

The Encyclopedia of Mexico is a two-volume reference work in English, focusing on the history and culture of Mexico. There are over 500 signed articles are by more than 300 scholars. There are overview articles on large topics; shorter articles, such as biographies of major figures or particular events. Lengthy examinations of particular topics in history are often divided chronologically and written by different specialists. The work is indexed and cross-referenced, with a bibliography following each article. The work is aimed at both specialists in the field as well as the general reader.

According to a reviewer, "this reference work would be a valuable addition to the reference collections of academic and larger public libraries." Another reviewer notes that most articles are authored by Americans and Mexicans to the exclusion of Europeans who write on Mexican topics in languages other than Spanish or English.
