= Encyclopedia of Latin American History and Culture =

Reference work

Encyclopedia of Latin American History and Culture is a comprehensive reference work, with over 5,000 articles by specialists in Latin American history, politics, and culture. The first edition of the encyclopedia comprises five print volumes, edited by Barbara Tenenbaum of the Hispanic Division of the Library of Congress. A second edition in 2008 comprises six volumes, edited by Jay Kinsbruner and Erick Langer, in print and electronic format. There are lengthy, comprehensive articles, as well as shorter topical ones. Three thousand biographical sketches of important Latin Americans range from the prehispanic era to the late twentieth-century from all parts of Latin America. There are a large number of illustrations and maps. In addition, there is large index to the set, and cross-referencing within articles. Reviewer Thomas E. Skidmore says, "The publication of this Encyclopedia is a landmark in the development of Latin American Studies in the English-speaking world. It gives convincing evidence of maturity of the field." Another reviewer praised it for "its focus on Latin America, is an ideal compromise between national and universal encyclopedias." It was reviewed in a number of other journals. Its editor won the Waldo G. Leland Prize "awarded every five years for the most outstanding reference work in history. The project was praised for providing information on individuals, culture, and institutions, which went well beyond the famous ones."
